= National Register of Historic Places listings in Channel Islands National Park =

This is a list of the National Register of Historic Places listings in Channel Islands National Park.

This is intended to be a complete list of the properties and districts on the National Register of Historic Places in Channel Islands National Park, California, United States. The locations of National Register properties and districts for which the latitude and longitude coordinates are included below, may be seen in a Google map.

There are six properties and districts listed on the National Register in the park.

This National Park Service list is complete through NPS recent listings posted June 20, 2025.

== Current listings ==
	Name on the Register	Image	Date listed	Location	City or town	Description
1	Anacapa Island Archeological District	Anacapa Island Archeological District	September 12, 1979 (#79000257)	Address Restricted	Port Hueneme	Photo shows Arch Rock near Anacapa Island
2	Anacapa Island Light Station	Anacapa Island Light Station	September 3, 1991 (#91001101)	Anacapa Island, Channel Islands National Park; 34°00′56″N 119°21′39″W	Oxnard	
3	San Miguel Island Archeological District		September 12, 1979 (#79000258)	Address Restricted	Santa Barbara	
4	Santa Barbara Island Archeological District		September 12, 1979 (#79000259)	Address Restricted	Santa Barbara	
5	Santa Cruz Island Archeological District		January 30, 1980 (#80000405)	Address Restricted	Santa Barbara	
6	SS WINFIELD SCOTT (Steamship)	SS WINFIELD SCOTT (Steamship)	September 12, 1988 (#87002111)	Address Restricted	Anacapa Island	Shipwreck.

== See also ==
- National Register of Historic Places listings in Ventura County, California
- National Register of Historic Places listings in Santa Barbara County, California
- National Register of Historic Places listings in California
