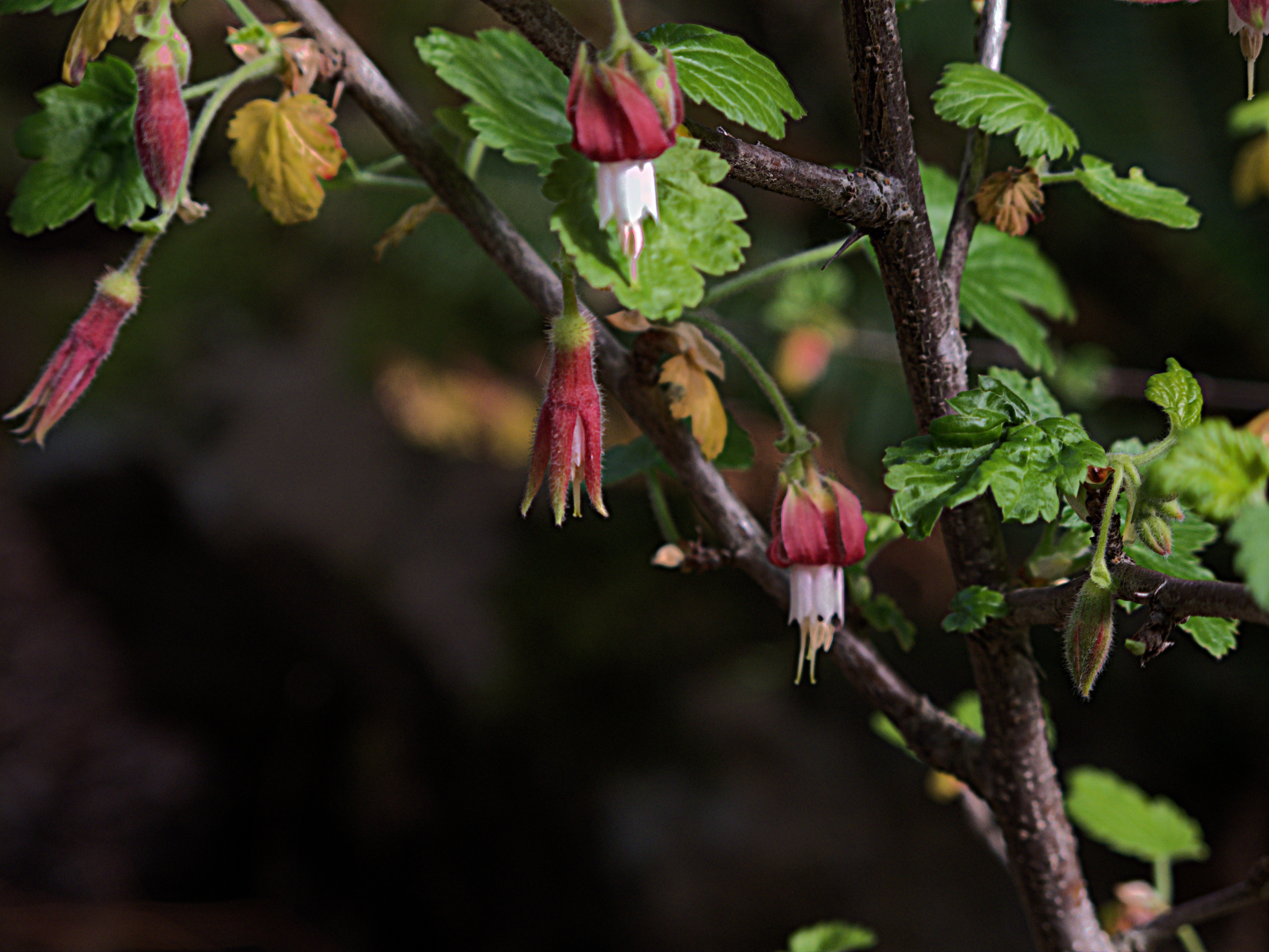
- R. thacherianum growing in Escondido, California

Conservation status
- Imperiled (NatureServe)

Scientific classification
- Kingdom: Plantae
- Clade: Tracheophytes
- Clade: Angiosperms
- Clade: Eudicots
- Order: Saxifragales
- Family: Grossulariaceae
- Genus: Ribes
- Species: R. thacherianum

Binomial name
- Ribes thacherianum (Jeps.) Munz 1958

Synonyms
- R. menziesii var. thacherianum Jeps. 1936 (basionym)

= Ribes thacherianum =

Species of flowering plant

Ribes thacherianum, with the common name Santa Cruz gooseberry, or Santa Cruz Island gooseberry, is a rare North American species of currant found only on the island of Santa Cruz off the coast of California.

== Description ==
Ribes thacherianum is an erect shrub growing to a maximum height around 2.5 meters (over 8 feet). The stems are coated in soft light hairs and bristles, and many of the stem nodes bear hard spines. The leaves are 2 to 3 centimeters (0.8-1.2 inches) long and shallowly divided into five dully toothed lobes.

The inflorescence is made up of one or two flowers. Each flower has five reflexed pink sepals around a tube made up of smaller white petals. The stamens and stigmas protrude from the corolla. The fruit is a purple berry about 7 millimeters wide which is covered densely in bristles and hairs.

== Distribution ==
Ribes thacherianum is endemic to Santa Cruz Island, one of the northern Channel Islands of California, and within Channel Islands National Park. It grows in the pine woodlands of the coastal ravines.
