= Thacher School Historic District =

Early private boarding school in California

- U.S. National Register of Historic Places
- U.S. Historic district
- Location within California Location within the United States
- Location: 5025 Thacher Road; Ojai Valley, California
- Coordinates: 34.4638°N 119.1820°W
- Built: 1895
- NRHP reference No.: 100003579
- Added to NRHP: 2019

The Thacher School Historic District is a historic district in Ventura County, California, in an unincorporated portion of the Ojai Valley. The Thacher School is one of the earliest private boarding schools in California. The district includes 60 resources, of which 38 are contributors to the district, which was listed on the National Register of Historic Places in 2019. The California State Historical Resources Commission recommended the nomination for federal historic designation in August 2018.

The buildings included within the historic district are in the school campus's central core, together with two outlying areas to the northwest and southeast that have been dedicated to equestrian uses.

== See also ==
- National Register of Historic Places listings in Ventura County, California
- Ventura County Historic Landmarks & Points of Interest
