= Anacapa Island Archeological District =

Archaeological site in California, United States

- U.S. National Register of Historic Places
- U.S. Historic district
- Nearest city: Port Hueneme, California
- Area: 700 acres (280 ha)
- NRHP reference No.: 79000257
- Added to NRHP: September 12, 1979

The Anacapa Island Archeological District, on Anacapa Island near Port Hueneme, California, is a 700-acre (280 ha) historic district that was listed on the National Register of Historic Places (NRHP) in 1979. It included 26 separate contributing sites, where there was a village site, an animal facility, a manufacturing facility, or other evidence having potential to yield information in the future.

Anacapa Island has a history of human occupation by the Chumash people, who "camped on the islands thousands of years ago"; shell middens make up part of the evidence of them.

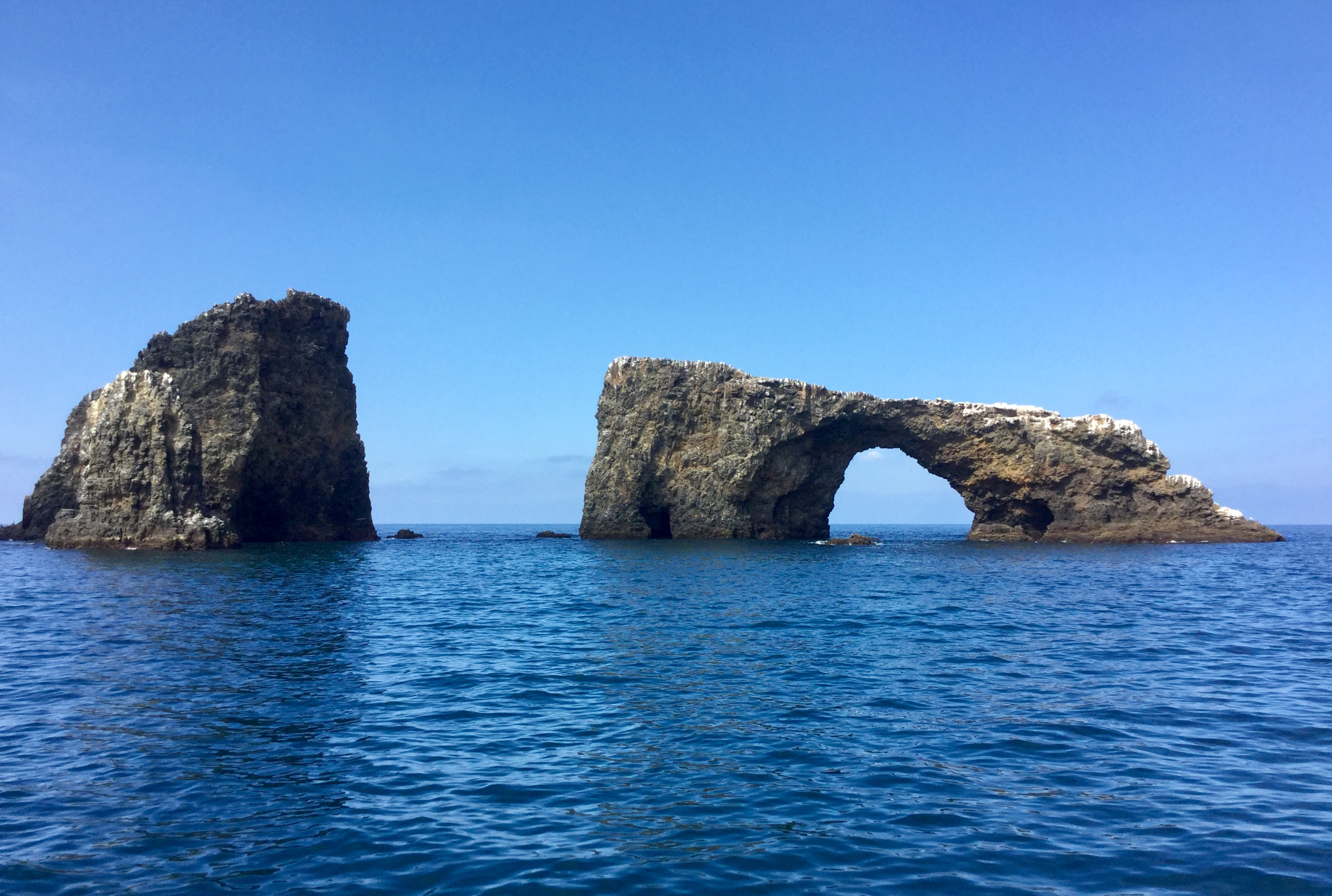

== See also ==
- Anacapa Island Light Station, also NRHP-listed
- Chumash people
- National Register of Historic Places listings in Ventura County, California
