= SS Winfield Scott =

1850 sidewheel steamer

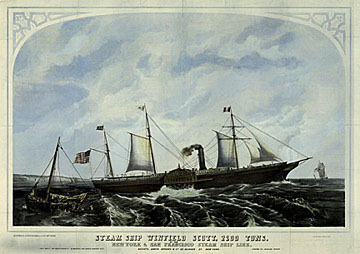
- Winfield Scott color lithograph

History

United States
- Namesake: Winfield Scott
- Operator: Pacific Mail Steamship Company
- Route: Panama-San Francisco
- Builder: Westervelt & MacKay
- Launched: 27 October 1850
- Out of service: 2 December 1853
- Fate: Wrecked on Anacapa Island
- Notes: Set a record 49-day transit between New York and San Francisco in 1852

General characteristics
- Type: Passenger
- Tonnage: 1,291 gross tons
- Length: 225 feet (69 m)
- Beam: 34.6 feet (10.5 m)
- Depth: 29.1 feet (8.9 m)
- Decks: 3
- Installed power: 2 × Morgan Iron Works side-lever steam engines
- Propulsion: 2 × paddle-wheels assisted by sail
- Sail plan: Three masts, square sails
- Capacity: 165 cabin; 150 steerage passengers
- SS Winfield Scott (Steamship)
- U.S. National Register of Historic Places
- Location within California
- Location: Anacapa Island
- Coordinates: 34°01′00″N 119°23′00″W
- Area: 0.7 acres (0.28 ha)
- Architect: Westervelt & MacKay
- NRHP reference No.: 87002111
- Added to NRHP: 12 September 1988

SS Winfield Scott was a sidewheel steamer that transported passengers and cargo between San Francisco, California and Panama in the early 1850s, during the California Gold Rush. After entering a heavy fog off the coast of Southern California on the evening of December 1, 1853, the ship crashed into Middle Anacapa Island. All 450 passengers and crew survived, but the ship was lost.

Winfield Scott has been the object of numerous salvage operations since the crash, and currently rests underwater as part of the Channel Islands National Park and Marine Sanctuary. The Winfield Scott wreck site is listed on the National Register of Historic Places.

== History ==
=== California Gold Rush ===
The discovery of gold at Sutter's Mill in 1848 brought thousands of people to California in search of fortune until the late 1850s. Since neither the Panama Canal nor the First transcontinental railroad had been constructed, people emigrating to California from the Eastern United States had three main routes of passage. They could travel over land, which was expensive and dangerous, or they could sail the roughly 14,000-mile (23,000 km) route around South America. This was more attractive to some but no less dangerous, due in part to the rough waters of the Drake Passage. In addition to the inherent dangers of either route, the journey often took as long as six months to complete.

The third route involved traversing the jungles of the Isthmus of Panama, then departing via the southern coast of Panama. While this cut the length of the sea journey in half, ships to ferry passengers from Panama to San Francisco were not commonplace. As a result, many had to wait months to complete the second half of their journey. To fill this growing need for swift passage from Panama to California, shipbuilding activities increased dramatically.

=== Construction and service ===
Winfield Scott (originally to be named Placer) was constructed by the shipbuilding company Westervelt and MacKay of New York, and was completed in March 1850. The ship was named for the celebrated United States Army general Winfield Scott (the stern was built with a bust in his likeness), and she was launched on 27 October 1850. An announcement in the October 20 edition of the New York Herald stated that "We understand that no expense has been spared to secure strength, safety and speed..." Her hull was wooden with double iron bracing and was made from White oak, Live oak, Locust, Redcedar and Georgia yellow pine.

The steamer, owned by Davis, Brooks and Company, initially transported passengers on the New York-New Orleans route. In 1852, the ship's ownership was transferred to the New York and San Francisco Steamship Company Line, and she arrived in San Francisco on April 28, 1852. Once there, she began taking gold seekers, nicknamed argonauts, on the Panama Route (between San Francisco and Panama). After the demise of the New York and San Francisco Steamship Company Line (which had been renamed as the New York and California Steamship Company in May 1853), the ship's ownership was again transferred on July 8, 1853, this time to the Pacific Mail Steamship Company.

=== Last voyage ===
Winfield Scott, bound for Panama, departed from San Francisco on the morning of 1 December 1853. In addition to her complement of passengers and crew, the ship was transporting a shipment of gold bullion worth an estimated US$2 million. The ship's progress was slowed in the afternoon when repairs had to be made to a leaking boiler, but she had resumed course at full speed. Later that evening, Captain Simon F. Blunt navigated the ship into the Santa Barbara Channel in an effort to save time. Captain Blunt knew the channel well, having helped survey the area a few years previously.

At approximately 11 PM, the ship encountered a heavy fog, and ran aground into Middle Anacapa Island (approximately 400 miles from port). Her speed at the time of the wreck was estimated at 10 knots (19 km/h; 12 mph). She struck the island bow first, and when Capt. Blunt attempted to back away the stern was struck, removing the ship's rudder. With the ship taking on massive amounts of water and unable to steer, all aboard, perhaps as many as 500 people, began scrambling for land. The ship was completely evacuated in approximately two hours, and the survivors spent the first night camped on a pinnacle of rock that measured 50 by 25 yards (46 by 23 m). The next day they moved to a larger piece of land on the island.

One of the passengers, Asa Cyrus Call, recalled "a terrible jar and crashing of timbers...I hurried out on deck, where my attention was fixed on a wall of towering cliffs, the tops of which were hidden by the fog and darkness and appeared about to fall and crush us. All round was the loud booming of angry breakers surging about invisible rocks."

On 2 December, the steamship SS California, returning to San Francisco from Panama, was alerted to the presence of the wreck survivors by the smoke of a gun they had fired. California rescued the women and children, as well as Winfield Scott's complement of gold bullion. On 9 December California returned to rescue the remaining passengers. The crew stayed behind to recover as much of the mail and passenger luggage as possible. Winfield Scott, however, had sustained too much damage and was left in the waters of the channel.

== Wreckage and salvage ==
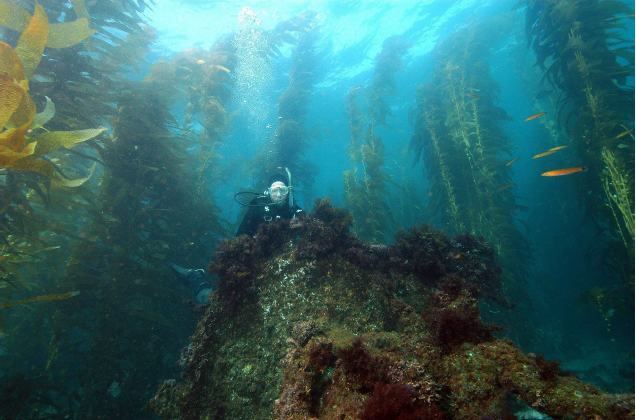
A diver investigates the wreck of Winfield Scott.

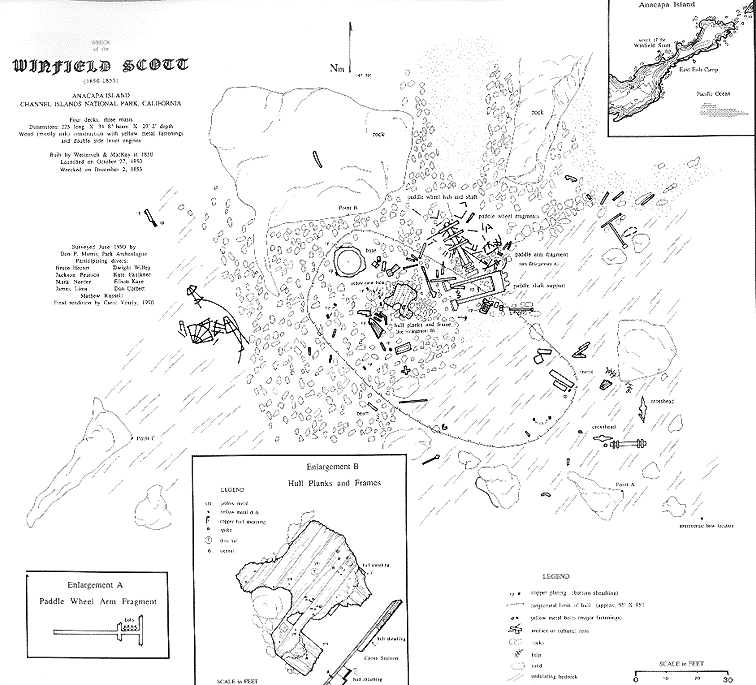
Scatter map of the wreck site

The remains of Winfield Scott are located under 25–30 feet (7.6–9.1 m) of water in the Channel Islands National Park and Marine Sanctuary. The wreckage site was verified in 1981 and was registered with the National Register of Historic Places in 1988. The site is protected by California and United States law, which prohibits divers from removing any part of the wreckage.

A salvage operation was undertaken in 1894, utilizing San Pedro. Much of the iron machinery, as well as hundreds of copper bolts, were recovered. An additional salvage operation during World War II recovered additional iron and brass for the war effort.

The remaining wreckage is considered important from an historical perspective, as it represents a tangible example of mid-19th century shipbuilding. Although much of the wooden hull has long since disintegrated, some of the machinery is still relatively intact.

Between 1853 and 1980, more than 140 shipwrecks were documented in the Channel Islands National Park Marine Sanctuary. As of December 2000, twenty sites had been located. The prevailing currents and weather conditions of the area make it a dangerous place for navigation.

In 1987, the California Wreck Divers Club was the subject of a sting operation to discourage salvage divers from bringing up artifacts from the Winfeld Scott and other ships in the Santa Barbara Channel. A coin was brought up from the Winfield Scott that was the major target of the subsequent legal case.

== Legacy ==
=== Light beacon ===
Shortly after the wreck, the United States Coast Survey recommended that a permanent lighthouse facility be built on Anacapa Island. Due to a lack of funding, the installation (an unmanned acetylene beacon on a fifty-foot tower) was not constructed until 1912. The tower was replaced by a lighthouse in 1932.

== See also ==
- National Register of Historic Places listings in Ventura County, California
- List of shipwrecks

== Sources ==
- Channel Islands Shipwrecks (PDF), Channel Islands National Marine Sanctuary, NOAA, 2011
- Chawkins, Steve (March 7, 2013), "Anacapa Island thrives after rat eradication", Los Angeles Times
