= Charles M. Pratt House =

Historic house in California, United States

- Casa Barranca; Charles M. Pratt House
- U.S. National Register of Historic Places
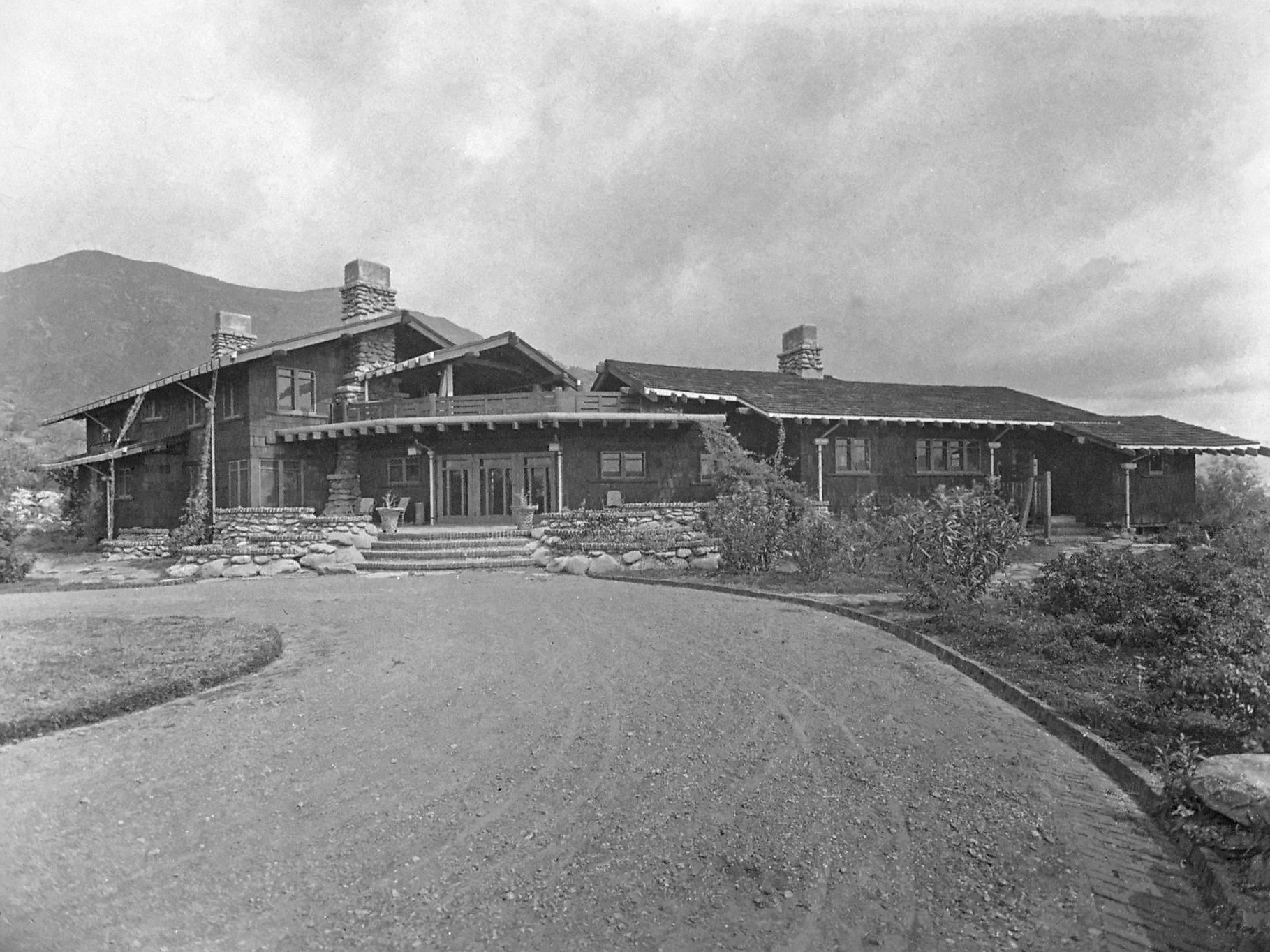

- Location within California Location within the United States
- Nearest city: Ojai, California
- Coordinates: 34°27′43″N 119°15′18″W
- Area: 5.4 acres (2.2 ha)
- Built: 1909
- Architect: Greene, Charles & Henry
- Architectural style: Bungalow/craftsman
- NRHP reference No.: 00001227
- Added to NRHP: June 14, 2002

Casa Barranca, more commonly referred to as Charles M. Pratt House, near Ojai, California is a historic Arts and Crafts-style house that was built in 1909 as a winter home for industrialist Charles Millard Pratt. It is one of the "ultimate bungalows" designed by architects Charles and Henry Greene of Greene and Greene.

It is a unique house, built for a client with "unlimited resources" in a rural location that allowed the architects to place the house "in a truly natural setting"; this "was the fulfillment of a lifelong interest of the architects." With the building site chosen within the original 14 acre parcel, an adjacent 38-acre parcel was purchased to preserve "the all important viewshed to which the house is directed." The combination of factors allowed the work to be created very consistently with intended principles of the Arts and Crafts movement. The structure and cladding of the building are almost completely honest and devoid of mannered veneers and false beams contained in the other "ultimate bungalows". It was listed on the National Register of Historic Places in 2002. As of the listing, the house and views are perfectly preserved.

The Pratts partially owned the nearby Foothills Hotel, which they could use for entertaining, so "they only needed the house to serve as “sleeping quarters” and family relaxation."

== See also ==
- National Register of Historic Places listings in Ventura County, California
- Ventura County Historic Landmarks & Points of Interest
