= Island Packers =

American passenger ferry service

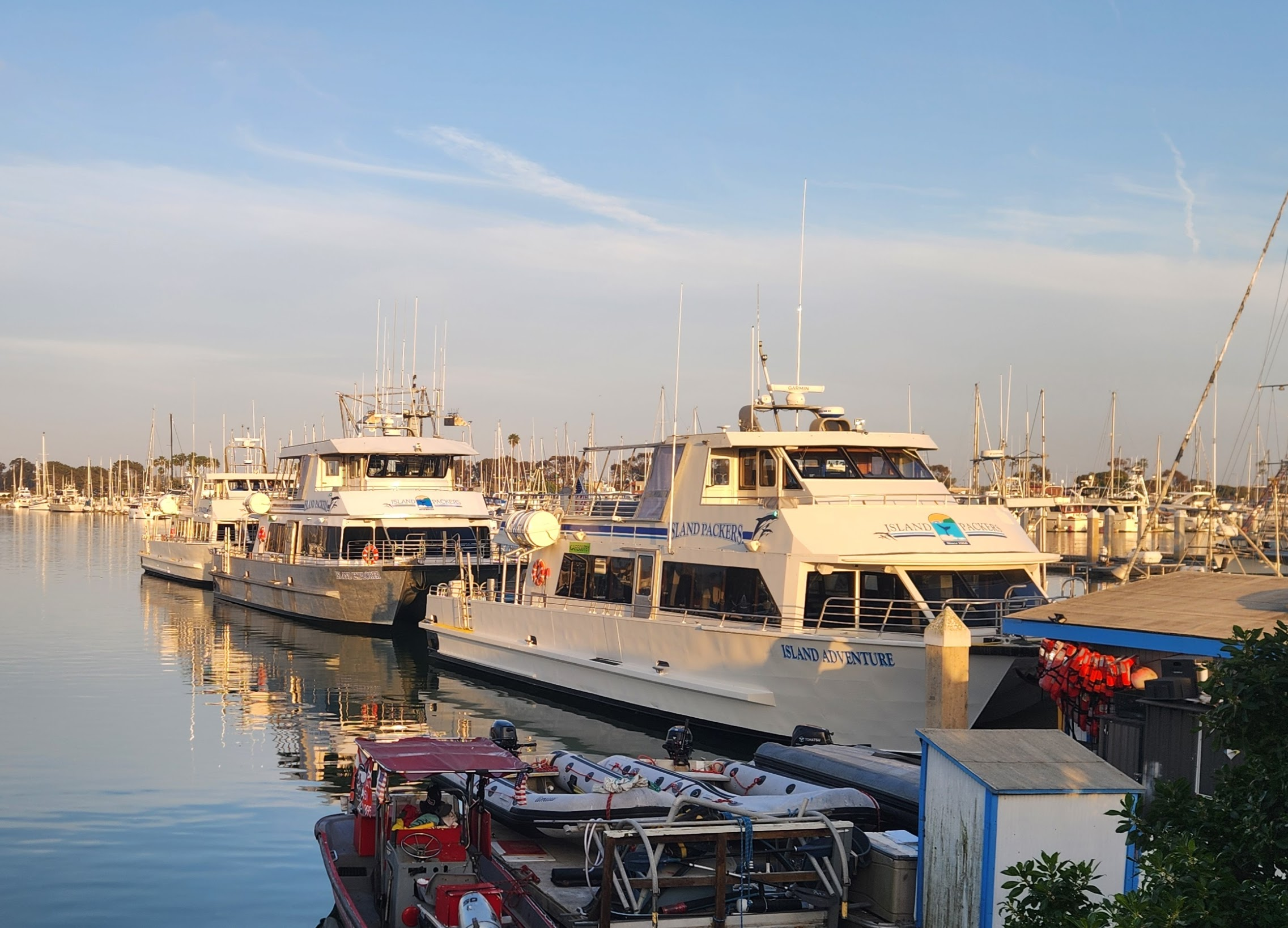
- Island Packers Catamaran Fleet, as seen from Ventura Harbor
- Type: Private
- Industry: Transportation
- Founded: 1968; 58 years ago
- Headquarters: Ventura, California, United States
- Area served: Channel Islands National Park (Anacapa Island, Santa Barbara Island, Santa Cruz Island, Santa Rosa Island, San Miguel Island)
- Key people: Bill M. Connally, founder
- Services: Ferry transport
- Website: islandpackers.com

Island Packers is an American passenger ferry service that operates scheduled trips between Channel Islands National Park and mainland California. The company began service in 1968.

In January 2024, Island Packers entered a new 10-year contract with the National Park Service. Additionally, Island Packers offers a variety of tours, including whale watching cruises, wildlife cruises, and bird watching cruises.

== Operations ==
The company provides transportation to all five islands within Channel Islands National Park: Anacapa, Santa Cruz, Santa Rosa, San Miguel and Santa Barbara Island.. Anacapa and Santa Cruz trips occur year-round, Santa Rosa trips typically occur March through November, San Miguel trips typically occur July through October and Santa Barbara Island trips typically occur April through October. Santa Cruz operations include Scorpion Anchorage, Prisoner's Harbor and Fry's Harbor (located on The Nature Conservancy owned portion of the island).

Access to Santa Barbara is currently suspended due to dock damage on the island.

=== Ports ===
Island Packers operates two harbors on mainland California:

- Ventura Harbor, Ventura, California, with service to Anacapa Island, Santa Cruz Island, Santa Rosa Island and San Miguel Island.
- Channel Islands Harbor, Oxnard, California, with service to Anacapa Island

=== Fleet ===
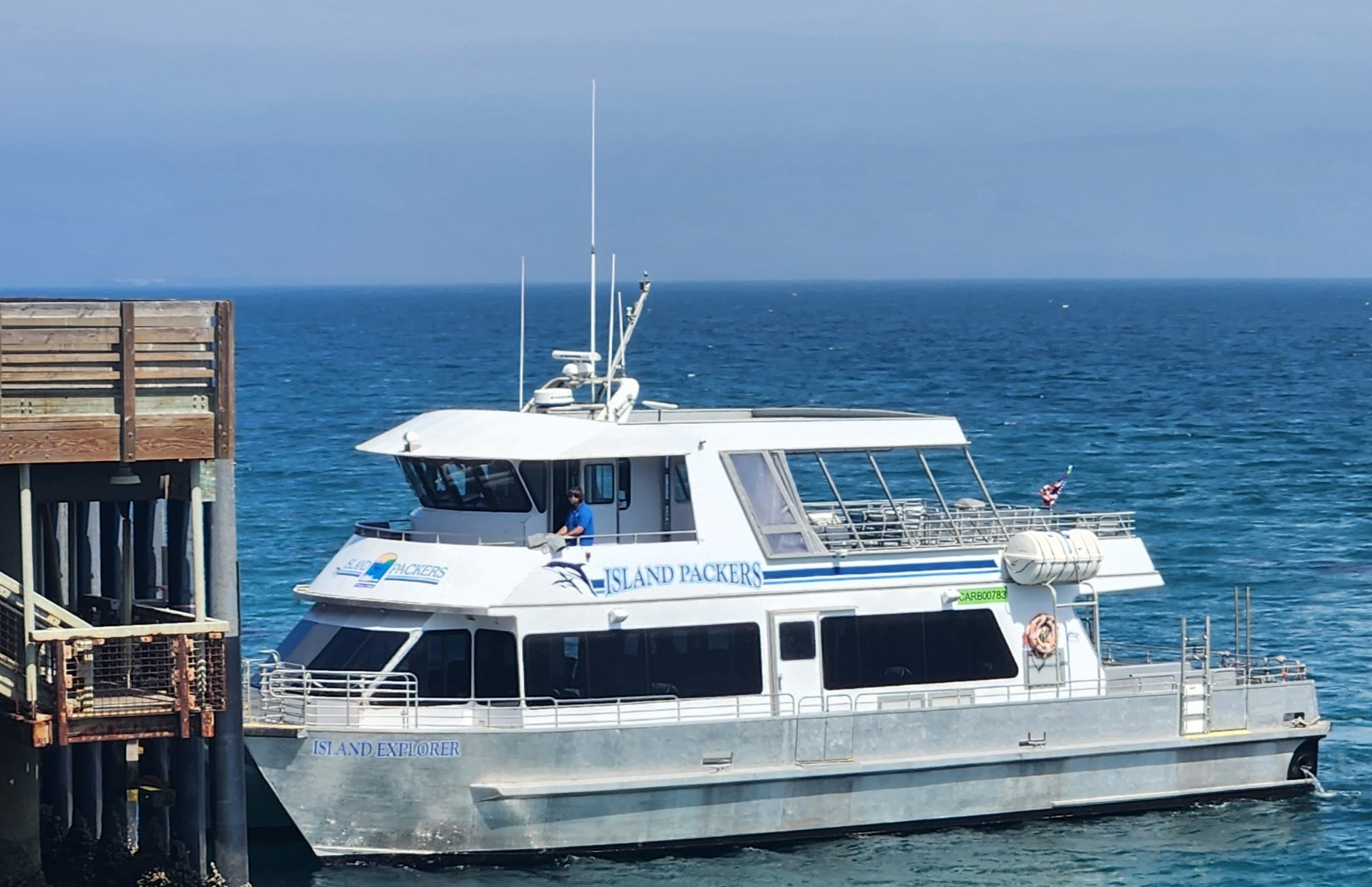
Island Explorer at the Santa Rosa Island Pier

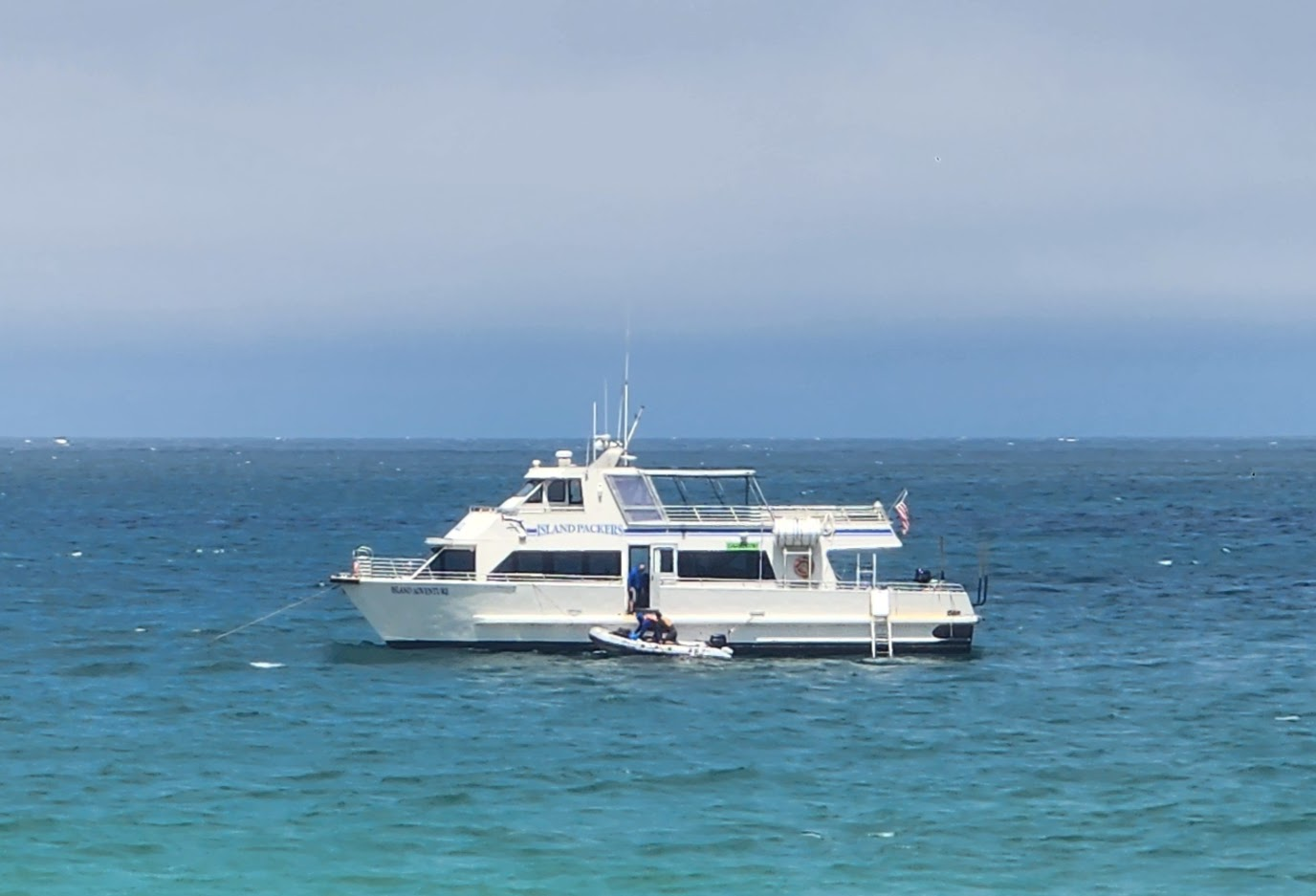
Island Adventure preparing to load passengers off San Miguel Island

Island Packers currently operate four vessels:

Name	Type	Length (Feet)	Passenger Capacity	Top Speed	Built	Notes
Islander	Catamaran	65 feet (20 m)	149	27 knots (50 km/h; 31 mph)	2001	First catamaran operated by Island Packers
Island Adventure	Catamaran	65 feet (20 m)	149	27 knots (50 km/h; 31 mph)	2004	
Island Explorer	Catamaran	65 feet (20 m)	149	27 knots (50 km/h; 31 mph)	2013	
Vanguard	Monohull	65 feet (20 m)	81	18 knots (33 km/h; 21 mph)	1991	Typically operates out of Channel Islands Harbor
