= Glen Tavern Inn =

Historic hotel in California

- Glen Tavern Hotel
- U.S. National Register of Historic Places
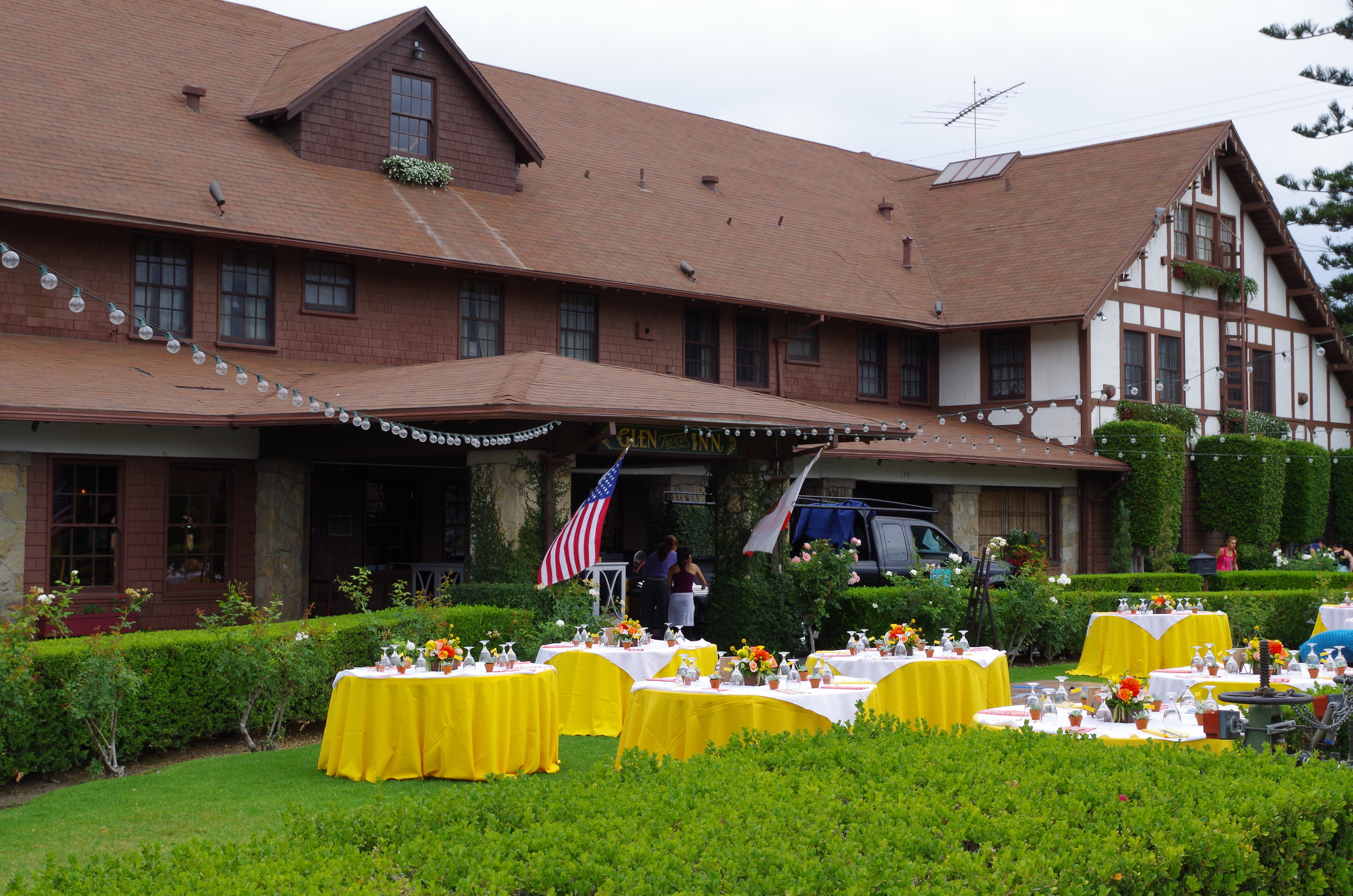

- Location within California Location within the United States
- Location: Santa Paula, California
- Coordinates: 34°21′18″N 119°3′40″W
- Built: 1911
- Architect: Crookshank & Summers; Hunt & Burns
- Architectural style: Bungalow/craftsman, Tudor Revival
- NRHP reference No.: 84001225
- Added to NRHP: July 26, 1984

The Glen Tavern Inn is a hotel located in Santa Paula, Ventura County, California. The building was listed on the National Register of Historic Places in 1984 and is an official City of Santa Paula and Ventura County Landmark. It is in the Santa Clara River Valley, approximately 12 miles (19 km) inland from the Pacific Ocean.

== History ==
The hotel was built in 1911 when Santa Paula was growing and prospering as an oil town and was headquarters to Union Oil. The Tudor-Craftsman hotel was designed by famed architects Burns and Hunt and funded by a consortium of twenty-five wealthy townsmen each of whom wanted one thousand dollars for its construction. It was erected directly opposite the train depot to provide accommodations to the many newcomers lured to the area by the burgeoning oil and citrus industries, and to provide a gathering place for Santa Paula's growing high society circles.

Beginning in the 1910s, Hollywood discovered the valley hamlet of Santa Paula. Its ruggedly picturesque vistas and hills – improbably close to the sprawl of Los Angeles - provided a setting for numerous Westerns. Many Universal film professions either stayed at the hotel or ate in the restaurant during these early years. The hotel also hosted William Jennings Bryan and famous pianist Ignacy Jan Paderewski. In later years, western stars like Randolph Scott visited the hotel while on location.

Because of its popularity, the hotel struggled to house visitors to Santa Paula. After city leaders sold the hotel in 1919, the Glen Tavern's new owner, Charles Estep, converted the hotel's unused attic space into a third floor for guests, completing the conversion around 1920.

Eventually, as oil money and old Hollywood moved on, Santa Paula settled down into a quieter constancy of agriculture and small-town life Americana. In June 1943, during World War II, the U.S. Federal Public Housing Authority leased the property from Estep. The government then converted the hotel into a woman's dormitory for employees working at nearby Port Hueneme. In 1946, the lease ended and the Glen Tavern once again functioned as a hotel.

By the 1960s, the train depot became defunct, and likewise, economic development bypassed the town. For the next half-century the hotel endured a marginal existence, alternating owners and uses many times as it slowly sank into flophouse decrepitude until it was eventually rescued by developers with intentions of restoring its original grandeur.

From 2005 through 2007, the Glen Tavern Inn was extensively renovated by the Jennett Investment Group. Mid-renovation, in April 2006, the hotel sustained a fire. Fortunately, firefighters were able to douse the blaze in time to save the landmark from major harm, and the burned portion was rebuilt.

It reopened as a full-service hotel, restaurant and lounge in 2007. The renovation preserved the Inn's historical attributes alongside the addition of more modern amenities.

On February 24, 2008, the Glen Tavern Inn was awarded Certificates of Special Recognition from the United States Senate, United States Congress and the California State Assembly for the successful restoration project.

== Ghost stories ==
Keeping with the hotel's motto "Where the Past Comes to Life" the Inn is allegedly haunted. In July 2007, the Ventura Paranormal Society held its annual convention there. In 2013, the inn was featured on an episode of Ghost Adventures with special guests Brit Morgan and Mimi Page. In 2014, the inn was featured on an episode of The Dead Files. In 2025, the Ghost Adventures crew returned for another investigation, this time joined by Korn's Jonathan Davis and paranormal investigator, Gary Galka.

One common urban legend maintains that during Prohibition, the Inn's third floor was utilized as a speakeasy, brothel and gambling parlor. But this is not the case. The third-floor brothel story was invented in 2022 to promote the hotel's haunted reputation and does match historical records. Many other legends, including tales of a murdered prostitute and gambler, were also fabricated for the same purpose.

== See also ==
- List of Registered Historic Places in Ventura County, California
- Ventura County Historic Landmarks & Points of Interest
