= Oxnard Historic Farm Park =

Gottfried Maulhardt and Albert Pfeiler farm

- Gottfried Maulhardt Farm
- U.S. National Register of Historic Places
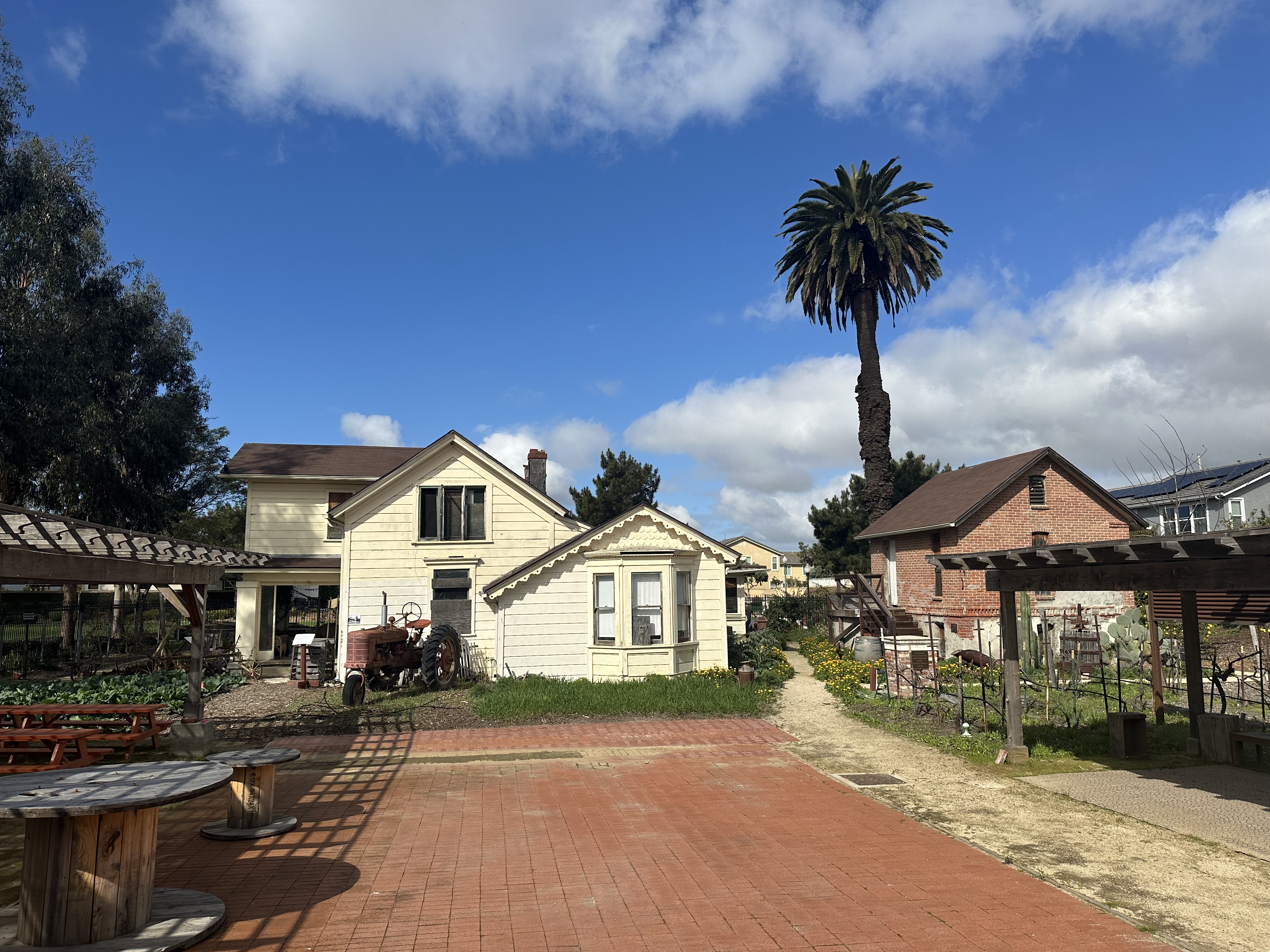
- Gottfried Maulhardt Farm in 2024
- Location: 1251 Gottfried Place, Oxnard, California
- Coordinates: 34°12′50″N 119°9′54″W
- Built: 1870
- Restored by: Oxnard Historic Farm Park Foundation
- Website: www.oxnardfarmpark.org
- NRHP reference No.: 100008891 =
- Added to NRHP: November 6, 2023

The Oxnard Historic Farm Park includes several historical buildings in Oxnard, California, United States. Listed on the National Register of Historic Places as the Gottfried Maulhardt Farm, it is designated Ventura County Landmark number 165, Gottfried Maulhardt / Albert Pfeiler Farm Site.

== History ==
Traveling from the Hanover region of what is now Germany in 1866 after the end of the Austro-Prussian War, the Maulhardt family with Christian Borchard started farming on land within Rancho El Rio de Santa Clara o la Colonia leased from Juan Camarillo Jr. in the late 1860s. Anton Maulhardt arrived first and by 1872, older brothers, Gottfried, Jacob, and Johannes, came and bought 1,243 acres (503 ha) for $10 an acre. Gottfried Maulhardt had 30 acres (12 ha) on which he grew grapes that were used for the sacramental wine for the Santa Clara Chapel. Albert Pfeiler acquired the site as a wedding gift. He moved in after his marriage in September 1904 and the Pfeiler family lived there for 96 years.

The Oxnard Historic Farm Park Foundation was formed to preserved the property in 2002 as residential neighborhood, school, and public park were built on the farmland surrounding the site. The Gottfried Maulhardt/Albert Pfeiler Farm Site was designated Ventura County Landmark No. 165 in 2004 by the Ventura County Cultural Heritage Board. After acquiring the property, the city had an agreement with the foundation since 2007.

The foundation made interior improvements to the carriage house to serve as the visitor center. They built a courtyard and planted crops and grapevines. The garden planted with lima beans, corn and sugar beets acknowledges the primary crops on the Oxnard Plain in the late 1800s and early 1900s. A Chumash-inspired garden includes California native plants which were used by the indigenous people of the Ventura County.

In 2021, the city approved a purchase and sale agreement with the foundation. The foundation must continue to operate the site as a historical landmark which is open to the public and the foundation had to secure landmark status at the state level.
