= Calleguas Creek Site =

Archaeological site in California, United States

- U.S. National Register of Historic Places
- Nearest city: Oxnard, Ventura County, California
- Area: 1.4 acres (0.57 ha)
- Built by: Chumash archaeological site
- NRHP reference No.: 76000538
- Added to NRHP: May 19, 1976

The Calleguas Creek Site is a 1.4-acre (0.57 ha) archeological site on Calleguas Creek and the Oxnard Plain, near Oxnard in Ventura County, Southern California.

== Description ==
It is the site of a former village of the Chumash people, and includes their burial sites.

The archeological site has been designated as CA-Ven-110, and was listed with its location is not disclosed on the National Register of Historic Places (NRHP) in 1976. It received NRHP listing to protect its potential to yield archeological information in the future.

=== Calleguas Creek context ===
The Calleguas Creek watershed area was of importance to the Chumash. They had at least five villages along the creek, which "provided them with sources of food, ceremony, cultural materials for baskets, jewelry, and clothing." Sites of Chumash burials have been uncovered at the Calleguas Creek Site and the others.

Unfortunately there has been "unlawful dredging and filling activity in the creek bed and channelization activities, [which] alter[s] and destroy[s] sacred sites and burial sites, sometimes without the knowledge of Chumash and scientific communities."

Calleguas Creek is one of California's most heavily polluted rivers, from agricultural runoff, urban and suburban runoff, and sewage discharges. It empties into the Pacific Ocean at Mugu Lagoon in the former Naval Air Station Point Mugu, present day Naval Base Ventura County. The saltwater wetlands and estuary habitat of the lagoon area is nonetheless significant.

== See also ==
- Chumash−related topics
- National Register of Historic Places listings in Ventura County, California
