= Ventura County Historic Landmarks & Points of Interest =

Designated by Ventura County, California, Cultural Heritage Board

The Ventura County Historic Landmarks & Points of Interest consist of buildings, sites, and neighborhoods designated by Ventura County Cultural Heritage Board as historic landmarks and points of interest in Ventura County, California. The county board of supervisors created the Cultural Heritage Board in 1966 and in August 1968, two sites were designated: the Faulkner House (VCHL No. 1) near Santa Paula; and the Edwards Adobe in Saticoy (VCHL No. 2). The scope was established to include the entire county: both cities and the unincorporated areas. The cities of Fillmore, Oxnard, Port Hueneme, Simi Valley, and Thousand Oaks have the county Cultural Heritage Board advise them and those designations are listed here. The cities of Moorpark, Ojai, Santa Paula, and Ventura established their own separate historic designation systems with the City of Ventura Historic Landmarks and Districts developing into an extensive list. The Port Hueneme Historical Society Museum houses historical artifacts, photographs and information on the history of the Hueneme area. The museum is in the Hueneme Bank Building (VCHL No. 32).

== Historic Landmarks ==
VCHL No.	Name	Image	Address	City	Date listed	Description
1	Faulkner House		14292 West Telegraph Rd. 34.326686°N 119.107079°W	Santa Paula	8/68	Queen Anne style farmhouse with three-story octagonal tower built 1894; also listed on the National Register of Historic Places in 1991; now operated as the Hansen Trust Agricultural Learning Center
2	Edwards Adobe		West of Edwards Ranch Road; 34.311209°N 119.133407°W	Saticoy	8/68; 3/90	Two-story house built in 1860 for William Dewey Hobson; it combines Mexican and "Yankee clapboard" styles; designation revoked in 1977, then restored in 1990
3	Row of eucalyptus trees		Highway 101, east of Lewis Road	Camarillo		A row of 1,000 eucalyptus trees planted in 1892 for Don Adolfo Camarillo's ranch
4	Cook Mansion		829 North Park Street; 34.418141°N 118.795122°W	Piru	1/69	Queen Anne style mansion built in 1886, destroyed by fire in 1981 and then rebuilt in 1983; also known as the Newhall Mansion and the Piru Mansion
5	Rancho Arnaz Adobe		9504 North Ventura Avenue; 34.408578°N 119.296843°W	Oak View	1/69	Built in 1863, it was the home of Don Jose Arnaz who leased and then purchased the 50,000-acre Mission San Buenaventura property from the Mexican government; also known as the Stage Route Half-Way House; it is the oldest continuously occupied residence in the county
6	Simi Adobe–Strathearn House		137 Strathearn Place; 34.274435°N 118.801291°W	Simi Valley	1/69	Built in 1810, also known as the de la Guerra Adobe; part of the Strathearn Historical Park; also designated as California Historical Landmark No. 979 and listed on the National Register of Historic Places in 1978
7	Sanchez Adobe		2317 Los Angeles Avenue	Saticoy	4/69	Built with one story in 1838, second story added c. 1900 [not found at designated location; moved?]
8	Don Adolfo Camarillo House		201 Camarillo Ranch Rd.	Camarillo	4/69	Built in 1893
9	Santa Clara Schoolhouse		20030 Telegraph Rd.	Santa Paula	4/69	Colonial style one-room schoolhouse with high tower, built 1896–97, also known as Little Red Schoolhouse
10	Tapo Adobe Ruins		4651 Tapo Canyon Rd. 34.323414°N 118.710194°W	Simi Valley	12/70	Sections of adobe walls can be seen at the Tapo Canyon Regional Park
11	Santa Gertrudis Asistencia (Chapel) Monument		N. Ventura Ave.	Ventura	12/70	The original chapel was built in 1809 and ceased operation around 1840. The site was in the path of the Ojai freeway, and the remains were moved in 1968 with several foundations stones being used to create the monument. Located 0.3 miles north of the Ventura Avenue Water Purification Plant on the east side of the road, flanked by two cypress trees that were scorched in the Thomas Fire.
12	Ventura County Courthouse		501 Poli St. 34.282352°N 119.293036°W	Ventura	12/70	Neoclassical courthouse built in 1912, designed by Albert C. Martin Sr.; became Ventura City Hall in 1972; terra cotta exterior decorations, friars' heads, and copper-sheathed dome; listed on the National Register of Historic Places in 1971 (first site in City of Ventura to be so designated) and designated as California Historical Landmark No. 847 and Ventura City Historical Landmark No. 4
13	Oxnard Carnegie Library		424 South C St.	Oxnard	2/71	Neoclassical public library built 1906–07 with funding from Andrew Carnegie; converted into an art museum; also listed on the National Register of Historic Places in 1971, the first site in Ventura County to receive the designation
14	Point Mugu Recreation Area/State Park			Point Mugu	2/71	Archeological site with remains of a Chumash village (Satwiwa) occupied for 6,000 years until 1850; also the largest remaining grassland in California; extends from Mugu lagoon southeast to Sycamore Canyon and northeast to Potrero Road
15	Naumann Giant Gum Tree and Eucalyptus Rows		East of Pleasant Valley and Etting Rds. 34.162457°N 119.148838°W	Oxnard	6/71	Row of eucalyptus trees planted c. 1900 stretching 1/4 mile for the Hueneme Masonic Cemetery
16	Sugar Beet Factory site		North of Wooley Rd. and east of Oxnard Blvd.	Oxnard	6/71	Site of second largest sugar beet factory in US, built 1898, manufactured sugar out of beets and played a central role in development of Oxnard; operated 1899–1959
17	Oxnard Plaza Park Pagoda		Fifth and C Street	Oxnard	6/71	Octagonal pagoda built in 1910 for well used to irrigate the surrounding park
18	Japanese Cemetery		East of Etting and Pleasant Valley Road	Oxnard	6/71	Adjacent to Masonic cemetery; markers are wooden boards with inscriptions; last burials c. 1960
19	Port Hueneme Women's Improvement Club		239 Scott St.	Port Hueneme	11/72	Built in 1915; listed on the National Register of Historic Places in 1989
20	Thomas R. and Mary Bard Memorial		West corner of Ventura Rd. and Park Ave.	Port Hueneme	11/71	Memorial to Thomas R. Bard, an oil pioneer and U.S. Senator, and his wife Mary; dedicated 1958
21	Rafael Reyes Adobe		Lockwood Valley Road, 2 miles east of Highway 33 at Reyes Creek	Lockwood Valley	11/71	One-story adobe house built in 1854 with wood and concrete block additions the 1920s and 1940s; fighting bulls were raised on the ranch
22	St. Mary Magdalen Church		2532 Ventura Blvd.	Camarillo	3/72	Spanish Neo-Classic built in 1913 as a private chapel for the Camarillo family; became a parish church in 1940; designed by Albert C. Martin Sr.
23	Southern Pacific Railroad Depot		963 E. Santa Barbara St.	Santa Paula	4/72	First train depot in Ventura County, built in 1887
24	Hueneme Wharf (original site)		Corner of Seaview St. and Hueneme Rd.	Port Hueneme	3/72	Thomas R. Bard built the county's first wharf, 900 feet long, at this location in 1871; destroyed by storm in 1938
25	Matilija Hot Springs		788 West Hot Springs Rd.	Ojai	8/72	Camp site established in 1871 in Matilija Canyon; cabins and hotel added in 1873; popular for its hot springs and for bear hunting
26	Post Office Tower and Portico		SE Corner of Ojai and Signal Streets	Ojai	6/75	Three-story tower with domed top covered in Spanish tile, built in 1916
27	Libbey Park Bowl Sycamore Tree		650 feet south of post office at Ojai Ave. and Signal St.	Ojai		Sycamore tree over 200 years old used in Chumash ceremonies
28	San Buenaventura Mission Aqueduct		Cañada Larga Rd. (south side), 1/4 block east of Highway 33	Ventura	1/76	Seven-mile long aqueduct built starting in 1792 to supply water to the Mission San Buenaventura and local farms; the aqueduct began at the convergence point of San Antonio Creek and the Ventura River. The section of the aqueduct in the photograph is located at 234 Cañada Larga Road (south side), 1/4 block east of Highway 33, and has been listed on the National Register of Historic Places
29	Santa Susana Depot		6503 Katherine Rd.	Simi Valley	1/76	Railroad depot built in 1903 by the Southern Pacific Railroad; now houses a railroad museum
30	Stagecoach Inn		51 South Ventu Park Road	Newbury Park	5/76	Grand Union Hotel built in 1876; moved in 1965 due to freeway construction, destroyed by fire in 1970 and rebuilt
31	Thomas R. Bard Mansion		Guadalcanal St. at Bard Lane	Port Hueneme		Italian Mediterranean style built in 1915 for Thomas R. Bard, an oil pioneer and U.S. Senator; purchased by the U.S. Navy in the 1950s and now serves as the base officer's club at the U.S. Naval Construction Center
32	Hueneme Bank Building		220 North Market St.	Port Hueneme	3/77	Built in 1925 in Neoclassical style, designed by Myron Hunt; served as Port Hueneme City Hall from 1959 to 1973; later operated as a historical museum
33	Josiah Keene House		41 Bell Way	Ventura	7/77	Second Empire/Victorian house with steep mansard roof built in 1872; also designated as City of Ventura Historical Landmark No. 68.
34	Foster Park Lion Entrance Markers		Casitas Vista Road at the east end of Foster Park Bridge	Ventura	7/77	Two large sandstone lions erected 1908 at entrance to Foster Park, a county park
35	W. L. Hardison House		1226 Ojai Rd.	Santa Paula	12/77	Victorian era, California eclectic farmhouse built in 1884
36	Union Oil Company Building		1003 E. Main St.	Santa Paula	12/77	Queen Anne style office building with Italianate influences, served as the first headquarters of Union Oil Co.; now the California Oil Museum; also listed on the National Register of Historic Places in 1986 and designated in 1991 as California Historical Landmark No. 996
37	Hueneme Slough Site		Surfside Dr. and Moranda Pkwy.	Port Hueneme	11/77	Now operated as Moranda Park, the site was originally a slough or tidal basin that was filled in 1938 with material dredged up to build the Port Hueneme Harbor.
38	Universalist Unitarian Church Building		740 E. Main St.	Santa Paula	3/78	Built in 1892 with local brick and river rock, it was designed by architects Seymour Locke and Frederick Roehrig; the oldest standing church in Santa Paula and one of the first Universalist churches on the west coast. Constructed of local brick and river rock
39	Mill Park		736 Santa Paula/Ojai Rd. at Bedford	Santa Paula	8/78	Grist mill built on the site in 1871
40	Simi Library Building (original)		137 Strathearn Place	Simi Valley	5/78	One-room library built in 1930; ceased operation in early 1960s and was moved in 1971 to Strathearn Historical Park
41	Haigh/Talley Colony House		137 Strathearn Place	Simi Valley	5/78	
42	Tapo Citrus Association Packing House Site			Simi Valley		
43	Hill Ranch Brick Cistern			Thousand Oaks		
44	Sycamore Tree near Stagecoach Inn			Newbury Park		
45	Pederson House and Water Tower			Thousand Oaks		
46	Tanner Homestead		18492 E. Telegraph Rd.	Santa Paula	8/78	Queen Anne style house built c. 1885
47	Fillmore State Bank		316 Central Ave.	Fillmore	5/79	Mediterranean/Italian Renaissance brick and terra cotta building built in 1917, designed by Albert C. Martin Sr.
48	Southern Pacific Railroad Depot		447 Main St.	Fillmore	5/79	Prefabricated railroad building built 1887
49	Trinity Episcopal Church		Corner of Saratoga and Second Streets	Fillmore	5/79	English gingerbread Craftsman style church built in 1901 in Hueneme; moved to Fillmore in 1933
50	Bardsdale Methodist Church		1498 Bardsdale Avenue	Fillmore	4/79	Carpenter Gothic church built in 1898; listed on the National Register of Historic Places in 1986
51	Piru Methodist Church and Organ			Piru		
52	Grandma Prisbrey's Bottle Village			Simi Valley		
53	Brandeis-Bardin Institute, House of the Book			Simi Valley		
54	Charles Collins Teague House (1924)		McKevett Heights Rd.	Santa Paula	11/79	English Tudor Revival mansion built 1923–1924
55	Methodist Church (former)			Moorpark		
56	Bank of A. Levy			Oxnard	11/79	
57	Lightworks in the Hueneme Lighthouse			Port Hueneme	1980	
58	Arundell Adobe		Three miles up Pole Creek Canyon	Fillmore	7/80	Built in 1885 for proximity to purple sage used in Thomas Arundell's honey business
59	Hinckley's Artists' Barn and grounds, including pepper tree		416 Bard St.	Fillmore	7/80	Barn converted to residence and studio in 1936, featured in Life magazine in 1936; 10-inch square areas painted on one wall by visiting artists; 100-year-old pepper tree is part of the designation
60	Church of Christ Scientist		461 Third St.	Fillmore	7/80	English Tudor style stucco church built in 1929 with winding flagstone path; designed by architect H. Roy Kelley
61	Odd Fellows' Town Clock		868 E. Main St.	Santa Paula	7/80	Four-faced Seth Thomas clock above the lodge's hall installed in 1905
62	County Fire Station No. 21 (former)			Ojai		
63	Goebel's Lion Farm Site			Thousand Oaks		
64	Hunt Olive Tree			Thousand Oaks		
65	Glen Tavern Inn		134 N. Mill St.	Santa Paula	7/81	Craftsman/English Tudor hotel built c. 1910; designed by Hunt & Burns; also listed on the National Register of Historic Places in 1984
66	Saint Rose of Lima Catholic Church			Simi Valley		
67	Simi Valley Community Methodist Church (former)			Simi Valley		
68	Brandeis/Bardin Institute, Main House			Simi Valley		
69	The Mill		926 Railroad Ave.	Santa Paula	9/82	Built c. 1890, now occupied by the Ventura County Agricultural Museum
70	First Church of Christ Scientist		731 South A St.	Oxnard	3/82	Mission Revival church built 1906–08; moved to Heritage Square in 1989 and remodeled as a town hall facility
71	Patterson Ranch Buildings			Simi Valley		
72	High Street Pepper Trees			Moorpark		
73	Murphy House		205 South F St.	Oxnard	4/91	California style bungalow built in 1911
74	Henry Levy House		155 South G St.	Oxnard	12/82	Craftsman house with English Tudor details built in 1914
75	Achille Levy House		201 South D St.	Oxnard	12/82	Shingle style house with Craftsman influences built in 1912
76	Ebell Club of Santa Paula		125 South Seventh St.	Santa Paula	9/82	Craftsman mansion built in 1917 as a women's club, now operated as the Santa Paula Theater Center
77	Charles Collins Teague House (1900)		805 Santa Paula St.	Santa Paula	9/82	Colonial Revival house built in 1900; designed by Greene and Greene
78	Underwood House		715 E. Santa Paula St.	Santa Paula	9/82	Queen Anne style house built in the mid-1890s
79	Moreton Bay Fig Tree		Corner of Tenth and Santa Barbara Streets	Santa Paula	9/82	Tree planted in 1879
80	Rice House		928–930 Yale St.	Santa Paula	9/82	Queen Anne style cottage with Eastlake detail built in 1880s
81	First Christian Church		829 Railroad Ave.	Santa Paula	9/82	Carpenter Gothic style church built in 1900 with a square bell tower and high-pitched pyramidal roof
82	Balcom House		933 Pleasant St.	Santa Paula	9/82	Italianate style house built in 1885; gutted by a fire in the 1950s
83	Baker House		525 East Main St.	Santa Paula	9/82	Queen Anne style house built in 1890 with French Mansard tower
84	Anna M. Logan House		123 North Mill St.	Santa Paula	9/82	Eastlake style house built c. 1888–1890
85	Somis Thursday Clubhouse		5380 Bell St.	Somis	7/91	One-room schoolhouse built in 1895; sold to a social club in 1924 and substantially remodeled in 1939 and after
86	Gerberding/Moranda House			Port Hueneme		
87	Farrell House			Port Hueneme		
88	Richard Bard House			Port Hueneme		
89	Chumash Park "Indian Hills"			Simi Valley		
90	Oakbrook County Park Archaeological Area			Thousand Oaks		
91	Chumash Village of Shimiji			Simi Valley		
92	Ramelli/Willett House		51 Sulphur Mountain Rd.	Oak View	7/83	Mediterranean style 26-room house built in 1926, designed by Roy Wilson
93	Wood Ranch Barns			Simi Valley		
94	Lathrop Camp			Ojai	7/84	
95	Pratt House		1330 North Foothill Road	Ojai	11/85	Craftsman bungalow built in 1909, designed by Greene and Greene, listed on the National Register of Historic Places in 2002
96	Dent Ranch House			Ojai		
97	Santa Paula Union High School		404 North Sixth St.	Santa Paula	1/86	Spanish Colonial school built in 1936 by Works Progress Administration
98	Wiltfong House			Port Hueneme		
99	Dos Vientos Ranch Buildings			Newbury Park	1986	Two large barns built by Malcolm Clark in the 1930s. Both were dismantled in the 1990s; the lumber was cataloged and is stored with the Conejo Recreation and Park District.
100	Justin Petit Ranch House		730 S B St.	Oxnard	4/86	Queen Anne Victorian-style house built in 1896; relocated to Heritage Square
101	Piru Train Bridge			Piru		
102	Sacred Heart Mission Church		Darling Rd., east of Wells Rd.	Saticoy	6/86	Burned down in August 2005
103	Whale Rock Ranch House			Ojai		
104	Stagecoach Road			Simi Valley		
105	Freight Road			Simi Valley		
106	Mount McCoy and Cross			Simi Valley		
107	Montgomery House			Simi Valley		
108	King/Harris House		1420 Grimes Canyon Rd.	Fillmore	10/86	Two-story white frame house built in 1910; later used as the Conejo Recreation and Parks District sports office
109	Crowley House			Thousand Oaks		
110	Five Trees			Ventura		
111	McKevett School (North Grammar School)		955 E. Pleasant St.	Santa Paula	5/87	Mission Revival style school built in 1910 with each classroom opening onto a veranda and courtyard
112	Edwin Janss Sr. House			Thousand Oaks		
113	Charles L. and Nellie Sheldon House		701 East Santa Paula St.	Santa Paula	9/87	Neo-Classic Row House built in 1900
114	James M. Sharp House		11840 Telegraph Rd.	Santa Paula	11/87	Italianate style house built in 1890
115	Hueneme Elementary School			Port Hueneme		
116	Whiteside House and Barn			Thousand Oaks		
117	Saticoy Walnut Growers Association Warehouse		1235–1255 East Wells Rd.	Saticoy	6/88	Warehouse built in 1917 for drying and shipping
118	Saticoy Bean Warehouse		10995 Azahar St.	Saticoy	6/88	Warehouse built in 1917 for lima bean growers
119	Farmers & Merchants Bank of Santa Paula – Saticoy Branch		1203 Los Angeles Ave.	Saticoy	6/88	Neo-classical bank built in 1911
120	Lake Eleanor Dam			Thousand Oaks		
121	Foster Park Bowl		438 Casitas Vista Road	Ventura		Outdoor theater located in Foster Park
122	Palm Trees along Chambersburg Road			Bardsdale		
123	Sanitary Dairy/Clifford Hardison House		1680–1686 Old Telegraph Rd.	Fillmore	2/89	
124	Piru Hotel			Piru		
125	Lechler House/Museum			Piru		
126	Stutsman/Hall Ranch			Ojai	9/89	
127	Pioneer Section of Simi Valley Public Cemetery			Simi Valley	1/90	
128	Fulkerson Hardware Store		3403 Somis Rd.	Somis	7/91	Stucco structure built in 1925
129	Masonic Temple Building Site		402 Central Ave.	Fillmore	6/90	
130	Farmers & Merchants Bank		364 Central Ave.	Fillmore	4/90	
131	Sespe School		627 Sespe Ave.	Fillmore	4/90	
132	Familia Diaz Cafe		249 S. Tenth St. 34.350914°N 119.058253°W	Santa Paula	10/90	Operated as a family since 1936; built in 1919, rebuilt 1928, remodeled 1980
133	Somis School		5268 North St.	Somis	7/91	Schoolhouse built in 1924
134	Coast Live Oak Tree			Simi Valley		
135	Spalding house, guest house, stone wall		3095 West Telegraph Rd.	Fillmore	5/92	
136	Elephant Rock			Simi Valley		
137	Palm Trees along Alamo Street			Simi Valley		
138	Sycamore Tree along Wood Ranch Parkway			Simi Valley		
139	Simi Elementary School and Bungalows			Simi Valley		
140	Scott/Cameron House and Aged Olive Tree			Simi Valley		
141	Ventura County Railway		250 East Fifth St.	Oxnard	2/92	13-mile railroad built in 1905
142	Barbara Webster School		1150 Saticoy St. 34.359697°N 119.059562°W	Santa Paula	2/92	Built in 1925 to serve the educational needs of the children of Mexican itinerant citrus and walnut workers
143	Olive Mann Isbell School		221 South Fourth St. 34.349176°N 119.066084°W	Santa Paula	2/92	Built in 1926; designed by Roy C. Wilson
144	Scarlett/McGrath Ranch House		5011 West Gonzales Rd.	Oxnard	9/92	Queen Anne/Eastlake residence built in 1889
145	Perkins/Claberg House		721 South A St.	Oxnard	6/92	Queen Anne and Stick style house built in 1887; relocated in 1989 to Heritage Square
146	Wineman/Lehmann/Miller House		101 South D St.	Oxnard	10/93	Colonial Revival and California Bungalow styles, built in 1903
147	Staire/Diener House		235 South D St.	Oxnard	10/93	House with Craftsman influences built in 1911
148	Palm Trees along "C" Street		C Street between Magnolia and Wooley	Oxnard	10/93	Mexican Fan Palm Trees planted in 1903
149	Japanese Nisei Methodist Episcopal Church		630 South A St.	Oxnard	10/93	Church built in 1908 for Japanese farm workers
150	Corriganville		1601 Kuehner Dr.	Simi Valley	8/95	Movie ranch opened in 1937; opened to public in 1949 as a western-themed amusement park; became known as Hopetown after Bob Hope purchased it in 1965; closed in 1966 and damaged by fire in 1967; it is now a park operated by the City of Simi Valley
151	Fillmore Sign		Northeast corner Highway 126 (Ventura St.) and Central Ave.	Fillmore	9/94	Lozenge-shaped, Streamline Moderne style sign installed in 1940 with "Fillmore" in 12-inch white neon letters; a neon arrow points to downtown
152	Rancho Camulos		5164 E. Telegraph Rd.	Piru	11/95	Ranch used by Helen Hunt Jackson as a setting for her 1884 novel Ramona
153	Bard/Prescott House			Port Hueneme	12/95	
154	First Church in Piru/Sullivan House			Piru	12/95	
155	Briggs School		14438 W. Telegraph Rd. 34.298166°N 119.155847°W	Santa Paula	3/94	Mediterranean school with an Italian influence and central courtyard built in 1925
156	Arts and Science Buildings, Fillmore Senior High School		555 Central Ave.	Fillmore	9/94	Two Mediterranean style buildings, built 1937–38 with Moorish arched entrances and Churrigueresque relief; designed by architects John C. Austin and Frederick M. Ashley
157	Sespe Bunkhouse		2896 Telegraph Rd. 34.318165°N 119.122313°W	Santa Paula	2/24/98	Built in 1910 or 1911, it housed unmarried white workers on a citrus ranch from the 1920s to 1940s
158	Swift Residence and Lying-In Hospital		838–840 West Fifth St.	Oxnard		House built about 1926 for Dr. Floyd J. Swift and a small office/hospital built in 1928
159	People's Lumber Company Building		216 N. 8th St.	Santa Paula	Neoclassical masonry building built c. 1890	
160	Knolls Rock			Simi Valley	7/26/99	
161	Henry T. Oxnard Historic District			Oxnard	9/14/99	Subdivision created in 1911 recognized in 1999 as a historic district on the National Register of Historic Places; bounded by Fifth Street, Magnolia Avenue, the alley between E and F Streets to the east, and the alley between G and H Streets to the west.
162	Fillmore Ebell Club		407 Second St.	Fillmore	11/13/01	Women's club and cultural center built in the 1930s
163	Rose/McGrath Ranch		228 Loma Dr.	Camarillo	6/10/02	
164	Selby/Roberts Residence and Site		11795 Santa Ana Rd.	Lake Casitas	2/28/05	
165	Gottfried Maulhardt/Albert Pfeiler Farm Site		1251 Gottfried Place	Oxnard	3/31/04	
166	Timber School House and Auditorium		1872 Newbury Rd.	Newbury Park	7/13/04	Mission style two-room school built c. 1924 (with addition from 1955) and auditorium structure built in 1948; designed by architect Roy C. Wilson
167	Edward Tobin Residence and Site		4440 Grand Ave.	Ojai	10/27/08	Craftsman bungalow moved to its present location in 2005
168	School Street Historic District			Simi Valley		Designation revoked
169	William Ford Residence		1015 Amber Lane	Ojai	10/25/10	Spanish Colonial Revival house built in 1929 with a Mexican hacienda layout; designed by the noted African-American architect Paul Williams
170	Acacia Mansion		205 S. Lomita Ave.	Ojai	11/8/10	Spanish Colonial Revival house built in 1929 with Moorish influence; Uno John Palo Kangas, who sculpted the Ventura Father Serra statue, was hired to do much of the work
171	Bon Ton Court		531 South F St.	Oxnard	12/7/10	Spanish Revival bungalow court apartment complex built in 1926 to provide housing for working class residents
172	Ventura County Agricultural Buildings		815 and 845 East Santa Barbara St. 34.358999°N 119.064584°W	Santa Paula	5/14/12	Spanish Revival office and garage buildings constructed in 1929; also a fumigation plant built 1938–39 in utilitarian industrial style with Streamline Moderne venting
173	McColm Manor Apartments		534–542 South F St.	Oxnard	12/8/14	12-unit courtyard apartment complex built in 1950
174	Preston-Butler Residence		1190 El Toro Rd.	Ojai	8/25/14	Two-story Spanish Revival house built in 1926
175	J.A. Swartz Residence		636 West Fifth St.	Oxnard	2/23/16	Spanish Colonial Revival house built 1929–30
176	Saticoy Southern Pacific Railroad Depot		11220 Azahar St.	Saticoy	05/2016	

== Points of Interest ==
POI No.	Name	Image	Address	City	Date listed	Description
1	Corriganville		1601 Kuehner Dr.	Simi Valley	1/82	Redesignated in 1995 as VCHL No. 150 (see description above)
2	Butterfield Stage Route			Santa Rosa Valley	1/82	Route used by the Butterfield Overland Mail in California to deliver mail between San Francisco and Los Angeles; the designation covers the portion of the route running from west of the Santa Rosa Technology Magnet School (13282 Santa Rosa Rd, Camarillo) over the hills to the intersection of Moorpark and Olsen Roads in Thousand Oaks; the Norwegian Grade was later built between 1900 and 1911
3	Oxnard Pest Control Insectary Site		Eastern half of block bounded by Scott St., Fifth St., Port Hueneme Rd., and Fourth St. (Ventura Rd.)	Port Hueneme	6/85	Buildings originally used to house season workers of a tomato cannery, moved to Fifth St. after WWI and used to breed the Australian ladybug, a natural predator of the mealybug then threatening the county's citrus orchards
4	Santa Rosa School (original site and school bell)		13282 Santa Rosa Rd.	Camarillo	2/87	School built in 1912 by Norwegian Colony farmers
5	Hueneme Grammar School (original site)		344 North Third St.	Port Hueneme	1/88	School built in 1885 by Norwegian Colony farmers
6	Saticoy Springs and Chumash Indian Village Sa'aqtik'oy Site		Bounded by Saticoy Ave., Telephone Rd., Wells Rd, and railroad tracks	Saticoy	5/88	Site of a Chumash settlement dating to 5,500 B.C.; ceremonial gathering at the site in 1869 drew Chumash leaders from the region
7	Simi School/Simi Library/Ortega Saloon Sites		1958 Third St., 137 Strathearn Place	Simi Valley	1/89	School built on Third Street in 1890, torn down in 1926; library built in 1930 and moved to the Strathearn Historical Park in 1971
8	Santa Clara Chapel Original Site		301 Esplanade Dr.	Oxnard	11/89	Moved in 1954 to 1333 East Ventura Boulevard, El Rio; original site later became a Sears store
9	Cesar Chavez Childhood Home Site		452 North Garfield	Oxnard	10/93	The Chavez family lived in a shed or small barn in the rear of the property in 1939
10	Colonial House Restaurant		701–747 North Oxnard Blvd.	Oxnard	12/13	Restaurant on this site was the most popular restaurant in Ventura County in post-WWII era, frequently visited by movie stars, including Marilyn Monroe, Bing Crosby, and Clark Gable; demolished in 1988 but brick fireplace remains Oxnard Boulevard
11	Former Fillmore Refinery		67 E. Telegraph Rd.	Fillmore	12/15	Ventura Refinery built on the site in 1915, later known as the Fillmore Works; operations ended in 2002 and were followed by remediation of soil and groundwater contamination

== See also ==
- National Register of Historic Places listings in Ventura County, California
- California Historical Landmarks in Ventura County, California
- City of Ventura Historic Landmarks and Districts
