= National Register of Historic Places listings in Ventura County, California =

Location of Ventura County in California

This is a list of the National Register of Historic Places listings in Ventura County, California.

This is intended to be a complete list of the properties and districts on the National Register of Historic Places in Ventura County, California, United States. Latitude and longitude coordinates are provided for many National Register properties and districts; these locations may be seen together in an online map.

There are 43 properties and districts listed on the National Register in the county, including 1 National Historic Landmark.

This National Park Service list is complete through NPS recent listings posted September 18, 2026.

== Current listings ==
	Name on the Register	Image	Date listed	Location	City or town	Description
1	Anacapa Island Archeological District	Anacapa Island Archeological District	September 12, 1979 (#79000257)	Address Restricted	Port Hueneme	
2	Anacapa Island Light Station	Anacapa Island Light Station	September 3, 1991 (#91001101)	Anacapa Island, Channel Islands National Park; 34°00′56″N 119°21′39″W	Oxnard	A boundary increase was approved August 22, 2024.
3	Elizabeth Bard Memorial Hospital	Elizabeth Bard Memorial Hospital	November 11, 1977 (#77000361)	121 N. Fir St. 34°16′56″N 119°17′18″W	Ventura	
4	Bardsdale Methodist Episcopal Church	Bardsdale Methodist Episcopal Church	August 28, 1986 (#86001986)	1498 Bardsdale Ave. 34°22′17″N 118°55′55″W	Fillmore	In 1898, a local group of German Evangelical Church Members joined with their friends and neighbors to “Step Out in Faith” and build the carpenter gothic building we now know as the Bardsdale United Methodist Church.
5	Bell Canyon Equestrian Center		July 18, 2024 (#100010547)	29 Baymare Road; 34°12′20″N 118°41′05″W	Bell Canyon	
6	Berylwood	Berylwood	September 15, 1977 (#77000360)	Ventura Rd. 34°09′28″N 119°11′48″W	Port Hueneme	Bard family's 62-acre (250,000 m^{2}) estate; leased by the Navy during World War II and acquired by the government in 1951
7	Burro Flats Site	Burro Flats Site	May 5, 1976 (#76000539)	Address Restricted	Bell Canyon	A cave containing Chumash pictographs near the historic Chumash settlement of Hu'wam along upper Bell Creek. A boundary decrease and renaming was approved July 2, 2020.
8	Calleguas Creek Site		May 19, 1976 (#76000538)	Address Restricted	Oxnard	
9	Camarillo Ranch House	Camarillo Ranch House	February 20, 2003 (#03000039)	201 Camarillo Ranch Rd. 34°13′05″N 119°01′02″W	Camarillo	Fifteen-room house built in 1892 by the Camarillo family, after whom the City of Camarillo is named
10	Case Study House No. 28	Case Study House No. 28	July 24, 2013 (#13000522)	91 Inverness Rd. 34°10′18″N 118°52′48″W	Thousand Oaks	Case Study House by Buff and Hensman, built 1966
11	Colony House	Colony House	September 18, 1978 (#78000824)	137 Strathearn Pl. 34°16′30″N 118°48′04″W	Simi Valley	Kit house on display at historical park with Simi Adobe and Strathearn House
12	Dudley House	Dudley House	May 12, 1977 (#77000362)	4085 Telegraph Rd. 34°16′34″N 119°14′20″W	Ventura	
13	Ebell Club of Santa Paula	Ebell Club of Santa Paula	July 20, 1989 (#89000949)	125 S. Seventh St. 34°21′06″N 119°03′51″W	Santa Paula	
14	George Washington Faulkner House	George Washington Faulkner House	April 25, 1991 (#91000485)	14292 W. Telegraph Rd. 34°19′32″N 119°06′18″W	Santa Paula	
15	Feraud General Merchandise Store	Feraud General Merchandise Store	January 23, 1986 (#86000109)	2 and 12 W. Main St. 34°16′51″N 119°18′03″W	Ventura	Historic bakery, now a bar
16	First Baptist Church of Ventura	First Baptist Church of Ventura	July 3, 2009 (#09000466)	101 S. Laurel St. 34°16′46″N 119°17′09″W	Ventura	
17	Emmanuel Franz House	Emmanuel Franz House	June 25, 1982 (#82002282)	31 N. Oak St. 34°16′52″N 119°17′38″W	Ventura	
18	Glen Tavern Hotel	Glen Tavern Hotel	July 26, 1984 (#84001225)	134 N. Mill St. 34°21′18″N 119°03′40″W	Santa Paula	
19	Thomas Gould Jr. House	Thomas Gould Jr. House	December 23, 2005 (#05001426)	402 Lynn Dr. 34°16′47″N 119°14′58″W	Ventura	
20	Grand Union Hotel	Grand Union Hotel	December 30, 1975 (#75000495)	51 Ventu Park Rd. 34°10′41″N 118°54′41″W	Newbury Park	Originally built in 1876, the structure was destroyed by fire in 1970. It was rebuilt and opened in 1976 as a historical museum, known in recent years as the Stagecoach Inn.
21	Grandma Prisbrey's Bottle Village	Grandma Prisbrey's Bottle Village	October 25, 1996 (#96001076)	4595 Cochran St. 34°16′44″N 118°42′14″W	Simi Valley	Folk art assemblage made out of bottles and other found objects begun in 1956 by Tressa Prisbrey
22	Isis Theater		January 12, 2026 (#100012536)	145 E. Ojai Avenue; 34°26′52″N 119°14′46″W	Ojai	
23	Gottfried Maulhardt Farm	Gottfried Maulhardt Farm	November 6, 2023 (#100008891)	1251 Gottfried Pl. 34°12′50″N 119°09′55″W	Oxnard	
24	Joel McCrea Ranch	Joel McCrea Ranch	April 18, 1997 (#97000295)	4500 N. Moorpark Rd. 34°14′35″N 118°51′24″W	Thousand Oaks	Working ranch run by actor Joel McCrea from the 1930s to the 1970s
25	Mission San Buenaventura and Mission Compound Site	Mission San Buenaventura and Mission Compound Site	April 10, 1975 (#75000496)	Bounded by Poli St., Ventura and Santa Clara Aves., and Palm St. 34°16′50″N 119°17′52″W	Ventura	
26	Olivas Adobe	Olivas Adobe	July 24, 1979 (#79000570)	4200 Olivas Park Dr. 34°14′40″N 119°14′28″W	Ventura	The only early two-story adobe in the Santa Clara River Valley; small one-story adobe built in 1837 was expanded in 1849 by Don Raimundo Olivas
27	Oxnard Public Library	Oxnard Public Library	July 27, 1971 (#71000210)	424 S. C St. 34°11′54″N 119°10′48″W	Oxnard	Former Carnegie library converted into an art museum, now known as Carnegie Art Museum
28	Henry T. Oxnard Historic District	Henry T. Oxnard Historic District	February 5, 1999 (#99000109)	F and G Sts., between Palm and 5th Sts. 34°12′01″N 119°11′11″W	Oxnard	District of historic homes located near downtown Oxnard
29	Charles M. Pratt House	Charles M. Pratt House	June 14, 2002 (#00001227)	1330 Foothill Rd. 34°27′43″N 119°15′18″W	Ojai	
30	Rancho Camulos	Rancho Camulos	November 1, 1996 (#96001137)	5164 E. Telegraph Rd. 34°24′18″N 118°45′20″W	Piru	A National Historic Landmark
31	St. Thomas Aquinas Chapel	St. Thomas Aquinas Chapel	June 29, 1995 (#95000785)	130 W. Ojai Ave. 34°26′53″N 119°14′49″W	Ojai	
32	San Buenaventura Mission Aqueduct	San Buenaventura Mission Aqueduct	March 7, 1975 (#75000497)	234 Cañada Larga Rd. 34°20′31″N 119°17′23″W	Ventura	Ruins of 7 mile (11 km) aqueduct built by Native Americans to bring water from the Ventura River to the San Buenaventura Mission
33	San Miguel Chapel Site	San Miguel Chapel Site	July 20, 1978 (#78000826)	Thompson Blvd. and Palm St. 34°16′41″N 119°17′48″W	Ventura	
34	Santa Paula Hardware Company Block–Union Oil Company	Santa Paula Hardware Company Block–Union Oil Company	August 14, 1986 (#86002619)	1003 E. Main St. 34°21′15″N 119°03′32″W	Santa Paula	
35	Saticoy Southern Pacific Railroad Depot	Saticoy Southern Pacific Railroad Depot	July 23, 2018 (#100002678)	11220 Azahar St. 34°17′05″N 119°08′47″W	Saticoy	
36	Scarlett Ranch		October 11, 2024 (#100010545)	5011 West Gonzalez Road; 34°13′25″N 119°14′16″W	Oxnard vicinity	
37	Simi Adobe–Strathearn House	Simi Adobe–Strathearn House	May 19, 1978 (#78000825)	137 Strathearn Pl. 34°16′30″N 118°48′01″W	Simi Valley	Old adobe and Victorian house built in 1892 that were the homestead of the Rancho Simi
38	SS WINFIELD SCOTT (Steamship)	SS WINFIELD SCOTT (Steamship)	September 12, 1988 (#87002111)	Address Restricted	Anacapa Island	Shipwreck.
39	Thacher School Historic District	Thacher School Historic District	April 4, 2019 (#100003579)	5025 Thacher Rd. 34°27′50″N 119°10′55″W	Ojai	
40	Ventura County Courthouse	Ventura County Courthouse	August 19, 1971 (#71000211)	501 Poli St. 34°16′57″N 119°17′32″W	Ventura	
41	Ventura Theatre	Ventura Theatre	December 29, 1986 (#86003523)	26 S. Chestnut; 34°16′50″N 119°17′26″W	Ventura	Historic theater now a music venue in downtown Ventura
42	Washington Elementary School		April 9, 2025 (#100011623)	96 MacMillan Avenue; 34°16′41″N 119°16′35″W	Ventura	
43	Women's Improvement Club of Hueneme	Women's Improvement Club of Hueneme	August 21, 1989 (#89001150)	239 E. Scott St. 34°08′58″N 119°11′48″W	Port Hueneme	

== See also ==
- List of National Historic Landmarks in California
- National Register of Historic Places listings in California
- California Historical Landmarks in Ventura County, California
- Ventura County Historic Landmarks & Points of Interest
- City of Ventura Historic Landmarks and Districts
