= Lens lantern =

Popular alternative to lighthouses in the 19th century

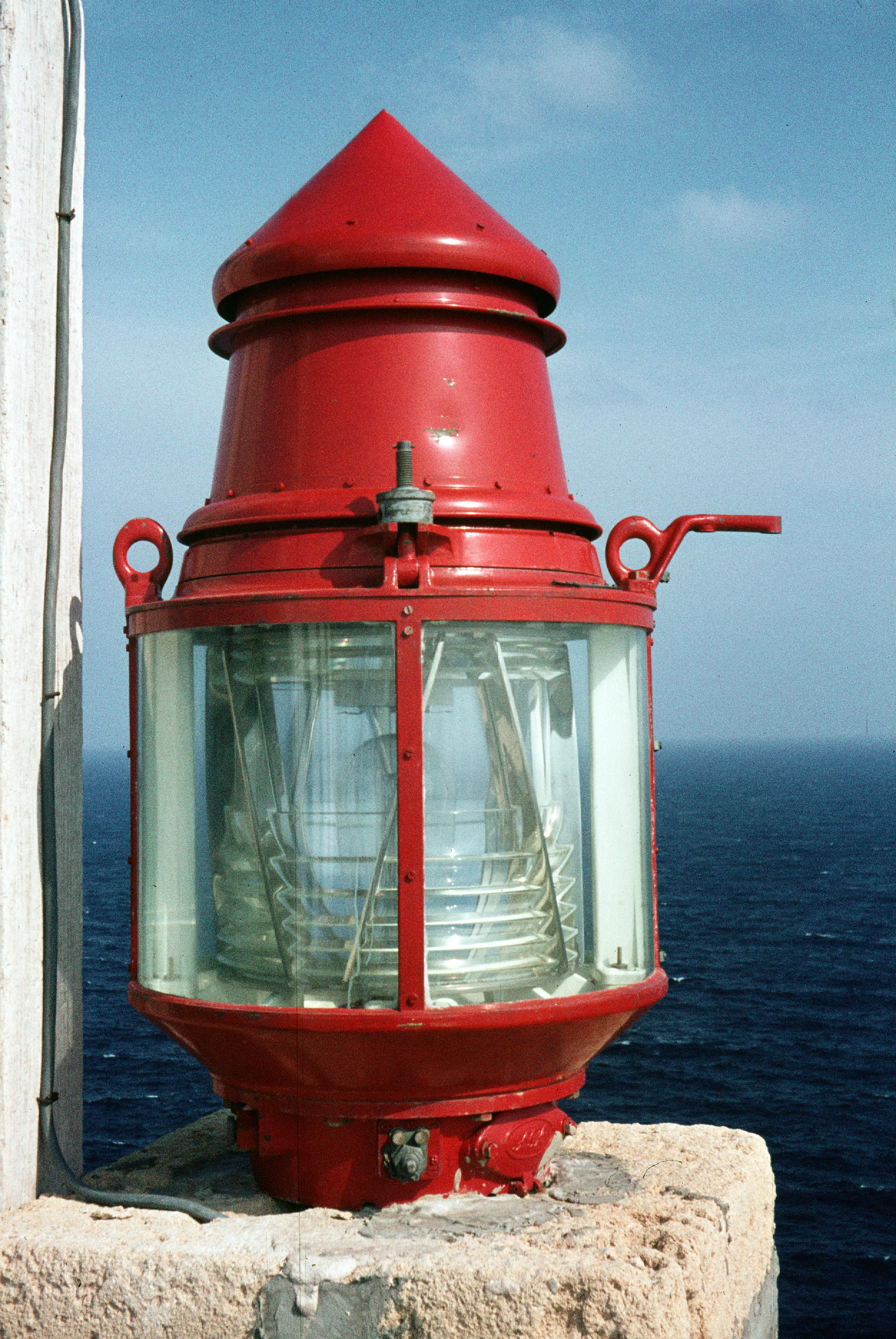

A lens lantern is a small, self-contained lamp structure which may sometimes be used to serve as a lighthouse. Unlike a regular Fresnel lens, the lantern requires no housing to protect it from the weather; its glass sides would refract and magnify the light in the same fashion as would the lens. Lens lanterns were popular alternatives to lighthouses in the nineteenth century; they required less care, were cheaper to erect, and could be fairly easily placed.

== Development ==
The need for beacon lights in the late 19th century led to the development of the "eight-day tubular lens-lantern" in 1885 by Joseph Funck. By using a large, circular oil tank around the top of the lantern, it could operate for up to eight days without additional maintenance. This lantern design, however, was susceptible to being blown out by winds. It was improved upon by David Heap, resulting in the five-day lens lantern in 1889.

== See also ==
- F. Ross Holland, Jr.
- America's Lighthouses: Their Illustrated History Since 1716
