= Channel Islands National Park =

National park in California, United States

- IUCN category II (national park)
- Satellite view of Channel Islands National Park
- Interactive map of Channel Islands National Park
- Location: Santa Barbara County & Ventura County, California, United States
- Nearest city: Santa Barbara
- Coordinates: 34°0.5′N 119°25.0′W
- Area: 249,561 acres (1,009.94 km^{2})
- Established: March 5, 1980
- Visitors: 323,245 (in 2022)
- Governing body: National Park Service
- Website: www.nps.gov/chis/index.htm

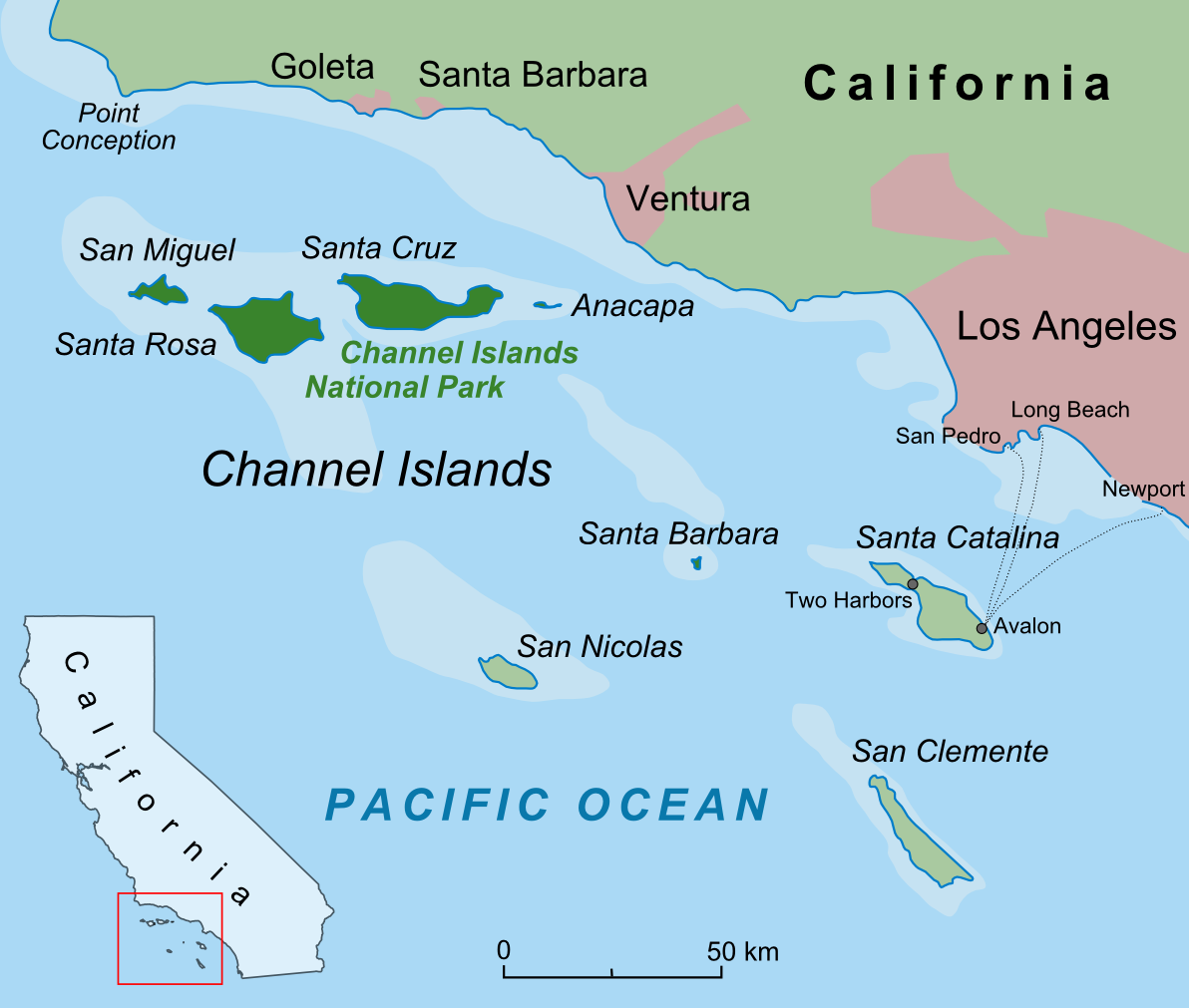
Map of Channel Islands

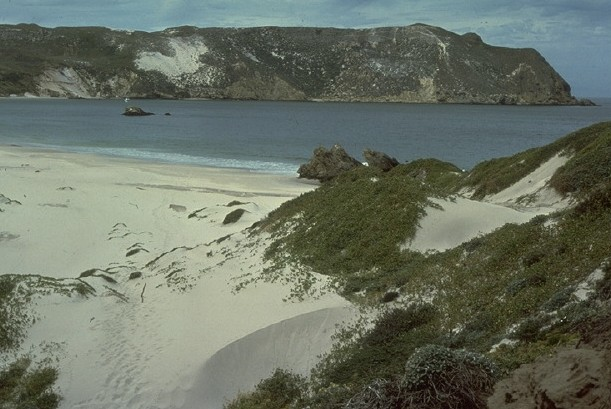
A beach in Channel Islands National Park

Channel Islands National Park is a national park of the United States, which consists of five of the eight Channel Islands off the coast of California. Although the islands are close to the shore of the densely populated state, they have been relatively undeveloped. The park covers 249,561 acres (1,009.94 km^{2}; 389.939 mi^{2}), of which 79,019 acres (319.78 km^{2}; 123.467 mi^{2}) are federal land.

Santa Cruz Island, the largest of the eight, is divided between The Nature Conservancy and the National Park Service. The Nature Conservancy owns and manages the western 76 percent of the island, while the eastern 24 percent is owned and managed by the National Park Service.

The islands are home to significant natural and cultural resources, resulting in several designations. Anacapa and Santa Barbara islands were made a national monument in 1938. All eight islands became a biosphere reserve under UNESCO in 1976. And five — Anacapa, Santa Barbara, Santa Cruz, San Miguel and Santa Rosa — were made constituent to the new national park on March 5, 1980. Of these, all but Anacapa are in Santa Barbara County, the latter being in Ventura County.

Channel Islands National Marine Sanctuary encompasses the waters six nautical miles around Channel Islands National Park.

== Park purpose ==
As stated in the foundation document:

The purpose of Channel Islands National Park is to protect and connect the public to the nationally significant natural, scenic, wildlife, marine, ecological, historical, archeological, cultural, and scientific values of the Channel Islands in the state of California.

== History ==
Archeologists discovered artifacts characteristic of ancient Paleocoastal sites that were occupied by the first islanders on the northern Channel Islands between 8,000 and 13,000 years ago. Scientists now believe that ancient sites from this period may be evidence of a coastal migration following the North Pacific Rim from Northeast Asia into the Americas, part of the peopling of the new world.

A fire pit in a midden-humus layer was dated at 9,900 years BC, while above this layer was a stone chopper with a butchered and burned mammoth dated 9,800 years BC. Several more fire areas were dated at 9,000 years BC, while human bones, Arlington Springs Man, are dated to 8,000 years BC. A circular fishhook was dated at 2,800 years BC. Huge shell mounds appear at 0 AD, while a camp fire in Skull Gulch was dated at 1695 AD.

Juan Rodríguez Cabrillo first observed the islands in 1542. The three northern channel islands were inhabited by an estimated two to three thousand Chumash, with eleven villages on Santa Cruz, eight on Santa Rosa, and two on San Miguel. In 1938 the Santa Barbara and Anacapa islands were designated a national monument. San Miguel, Santa Rosa and Santa Cruz islands were combined with the monument in 1980 to form modern-day Channel Islands National Park.

=== Oil spills and natural seepage ===
On January 28, 1969, an oil rig belonging to Union Oil experienced a blow-out 6 miles (9.7 km) off the coast of California. The resulting spill was, at the time, the largest oil spill to occur in United States territorial waters. Crews took approximately 11 days to seal the rupture using a cement plug, during which approximately 200,000 US gallons (760,000 litres; 170,000 imperial gallons) of crude oil spilled into the Pacific Ocean, creating an oil slick with an area of about 800 square miles (2,100 km^{2}). Following the spill, tides carried the oil onto the beaches of the Anacapa, San Miguel, Santa Rosa and Santa Cruz islands.

This spill had a large impact on native wildlife of the Channel Islands. Much of the islands' seabird population was affected, with over an estimated 3,600 avians killed. Meanwhile, seals, dolphins and other sea life died and washed ashore on both the islands and the mainland.

This spill is the third largest oil spill in the United States, only surpassed by the Deepwater Horizon and the Exxon Valdez oil spills. It resulted in a 34,000-acre (140 square-kilometer; 53-square-mile) expansion of the Department of the Interior buffer zone in the channel and contributed to the formation of the Environmental Protection Agency.

The State of California Department of Oil and Gas noted 29 natural oil seeps between Point Conception and Rincon Point. The seeps were noted by Father Pedro Font in 1776. Additionally, tar mounds are concentrated off the coast at Point Conception, Coal Oil Point, and Carpinteria. A natural oil seep also exists off the west coast of San Miguel Island. Finally, the distinctive odor of the petroliferous Monterey Shale is evident on the eastern end of Santa Cruz Island. The Chumash used the tar and oil from these seeps for caulking and adhesives.

== Geography ==
The islands within the park extend along the Southern California coast from Point Conception near Santa Barbara to San Pedro, a neighborhood of Los Angeles. Park headquarters and the Robert J. Lagomarsino Visitor Center are located in the city of Ventura.

The park consists of 249,354 acres (1,009.10 km^{2}; 389.616 mi^{2}), half of which are under the ocean, and includes the islands of:

- San Miguel 9,325 acres (37.74 km^{2}; 14.570 mi^{2})
- Santa Rosa 52,794 acres (213.65 km^{2}; 82.491 mi^{2})
- Anacapa 699 acres (2.83 km^{2}; 1.092 mi^{2})
- Santa Barbara 639 acres (2.59 km^{2}; 0.998 mi^{2})
- Santa Cruz 60,645 acres (245.42 km^{2}; 94.758 mi^{2}) 76% owned by the Nature Conservancy, 24% by the National Park Service

== Climate ==
According to the Köppen climate classification system, Anacapa Island has a Warm-summer Mediterranean climate (Csb).

Climate data for Anacapa Island, elevation 36 ft (11 m), 1981–2010 normals, extremes 1981–2019
Month	Jan	Feb	Mar	Apr	May	Jun	Jul	Aug	Sep	Oct	Nov	Dec	Year
Record high °F (°C)	81.5 (27.5)	77.8 (25.4)	83.5 (28.6)	90.8 (32.7)	86.0 (30.0)	97.4 (36.3)	85.1 (29.5)	81.6 (27.6)	90.4 (32.4)	92.6 (33.7)	94.1 (34.5)	77.9 (25.5)	97.4 (36.3)
Mean daily maximum °F (°C)	62.4 (16.9)	61.4 (16.3)	62.0 (16.7)	63.6 (17.6)	64.9 (18.3)	66.8 (19.3)	68.8 (20.4)	69.7 (20.9)	70.1 (21.2)	69.0 (20.6)	65.9 (18.8)	61.8 (16.6)	65.6 (18.7)
Mean daily minimum °F (°C)	51.6 (10.9)	52.3 (11.3)	52.4 (11.3)	51.7 (10.9)	54.6 (12.6)	57.3 (14.1)	59.7 (15.4)	60.9 (16.1)	60.7 (15.9)	59.1 (15.1)	55.3 (12.9)	52.0 (11.1)	55.7 (13.2)
Record low °F (°C)	37.0 (2.8)	39.5 (4.2)	40.5 (4.7)	39.7 (4.3)	47.6 (8.7)	49.7 (9.8)	53.7 (12.1)	53.1 (11.7)	53.3 (11.8)	47.5 (8.6)	44.6 (7.0)	36.9 (2.7)	36.9 (2.7)
Average precipitation inches (mm)	2.70 (69)	3.03 (77)	1.87 (47)	0.72 (18)	0.11 (2.8)	0.01 (0.25)	0.02 (0.51)	0.03 (0.76)	0.35 (8.9)	0.54 (14)	0.96 (24)	1.55 (39)	11.89 (302)
Average dew point °F (°C)	45.2 (7.3)	47.0 (8.3)	49.1 (9.5)	49.1 (9.5)	52.9 (11.6)	55.9 (13.3)	58.6 (14.8)	59.6 (15.3)	58.7 (14.8)	55.0 (12.8)	48.4 (9.1)	44.1 (6.7)	52.0 (11.1)
Source: PRISM

== Geology ==
Weaver describes the geologic province of Anacapia as consisting of the islands of San Miguel, Santa Rosa, Santa Cruz, and Anacapa, plus the western portion of the Santa Monica Mountains. The province is to the south of the Santa Barbara embayment, and north of the Catalinia geologic province. Mesozoic in origin, the Anacapia province consists of Late Cretaceous to Miocene age marine sedimentary up to 23,000 feet thick, including 8,000 feet of volcanic rocks, overlain by Pleistocene terrace formations. Aligned with the Santa Monica mountains, the Northern Channel Islands form a mountain system 130 miles long. This island chain appears to be a faulted east-west trending anticline. Major faults include the Santa Cruz Island Fault and the Santa Rosa Island Fault.

A stratigraphic column would start with the oldest rocks, the Santa Cruz Island schist, forming an elongated core of the island, 10 miles long and 1.5 miles wide. This schist is intruded by the metamorphosed Alamos Tonalite, which has been dated 145 Ma. Just to the south of this schist is the Willows Diorite, also of the same age as the tonalite, or Late Jurassic. The only Cretaceous rocks consist of the Jalama Formation, found on San Miguel Island.

Lower Tertiary sequence of rocks are found within the Christi Anticline on the southwestern part of Santa Cruz Island. The sequence includes the Pozo Formation, Canada Formation, Jolla Vieja Formation, and the Cozy Dell Formation. San Miguel and Santa Rosa islands have the Middle to Late Eocene South Point Formation, while the Cozy Dell Formation is present on Santa Rosa, along with the Sespe Formation.

Middle Tertiary formations found on Santa Rosa and Santa Cruz include the Vaqueros Formation, while those two islands plus San Miguel have exposures of the Rincon Formation, and Monterey Formation. Santa Rosa and San Miguel have exposures of the basaltic and dacitic San Miguel Volcanics, which include pillow structures, while the San Onofre Breccia is found on Santa Rosa, Santa Cruz, and Anacapa. Santa Rosa Island Volcanics consist mainly of basaltic breccia, which erupted about 19 Ma. San Miguel Volcanics consist of basalt and andesite flows, which erupted between 17 and 18 Ma. Santa Cruz Island (SCI) Volcanics on the north side of the island consist of andesitic flows and volcaniclastics, overlying the San Onofre Breccia, and dated at about 16 Ma. The eruptive center is east of Devils Peak, and juxtaposed against the west-northwest trending strike-slip Santa Cruz Island Fault to the south. These 2400 m of SCI Volcanics have been further subdivide into four members, consisting of the lowermost Griffith Canyon, followed by Stanton Ranch, Devil's Peak, and Prisoner's Harbor, the uppermost. The Griffith Canyon Member consists of basaltic and andesitic epiclastic volcanic breccias. The Stanton Ranch Member consists of andesitic flows, flow breccias, and tuff breccias. The Devil's Peak Member consists of scoriaceous andesitic and dacitic flows. The Prisoner's Harbor Member consists of andesitic and dacitic transitional to rhyolitic flows, flow breccias, and tuffaceous volcaniclastic beds. Middle Miocene Conejo Volcanics correlate with the bulk of Anacapa's lava flows, volcanic and volcaniclastic breccias, which consist of vesicular and porphyritic andesite erupting about 16 Ma. About 1700 m are exposed, with two strata of San Onofre Breccia interbedded at the base. Cores taken from the east end of the island are andesitic in composition. Santa Barbara Island consists of basalt-basaltic andesite and andesite volcanic flows, which erupted 15–17 Ma.

During the Late Pleistocene, all of the islands were much closer to the mainland due to lower sea levels, and between 11,000 and 20,000 years BP, the islands remained connected to each other as Santa Rosae. The Pleistocene mammoths swam to Santa Rosae. However, the pygmy mammoth underwent dwarfing as the Channel Islands became isolated. Another species which became extinct was the "giant" mouse. Mammoth remains include those of Mammuthus columbi, while the remains of Mammuthus exilis have been found on San Miguel, Santa Rosa, and Santa Cruz, ranging in age from 12,840 to >47,000 YBP. The 1994 Mammuthus exilis discovery on Santa Rosa near Carrington Point, was the first example of an in situ, almost complete, articulated skeleton.

Other geologic features of note on the islands include beachrock, eolianite, and caliche pseudomorphs.

== Flora and fauna ==
Dolphins by Anacapa Island.

More than 2,000 species of plants and animals can be found within the park. However, only three land mammals are native to the islands, one of which is the Gambel's deer mouse (Peromyscus gambelii) which is known to carry the sin nombre hantavirus. The western spotted skunk and island fox also are native, with the fox endemic to the islands. The island fence lizard is also endemic to the Channel Islands. Other animals in the park include island scrub jay, harbor seal, California sea lion, island night lizard, barn owl, American kestrel, horned lark and meadowlark and California brown pelican. One hundred and forty-five species are unique to the islands and found nowhere else in the world. Marine life ranges from microscopic plankton to the endangered blue whale, the largest animal on earth. Archeological and cultural resources span a period of more than 10,000 years.

== Headquarters and mainland visitor center ==
The visitor center is located in the Ventura Harbor. The visitor center contains several exhibits including an aquarium, that provide information regarding all five islands, native vegetation, marine life and cultural history. Also, visitors can enjoy a short film, free of charge, that provides an overview of all five islands. The visitor center is open every day, except Thanksgiving and Christmas, from 8:30AM–5:00PM. There is also a gift shop where souvenirs can be purchased. The average annual visitation to the mainland visitor center was around 311,000 in the period from 2009 to 2018, with 366,250 visiting in 2018.

== Recreation ==
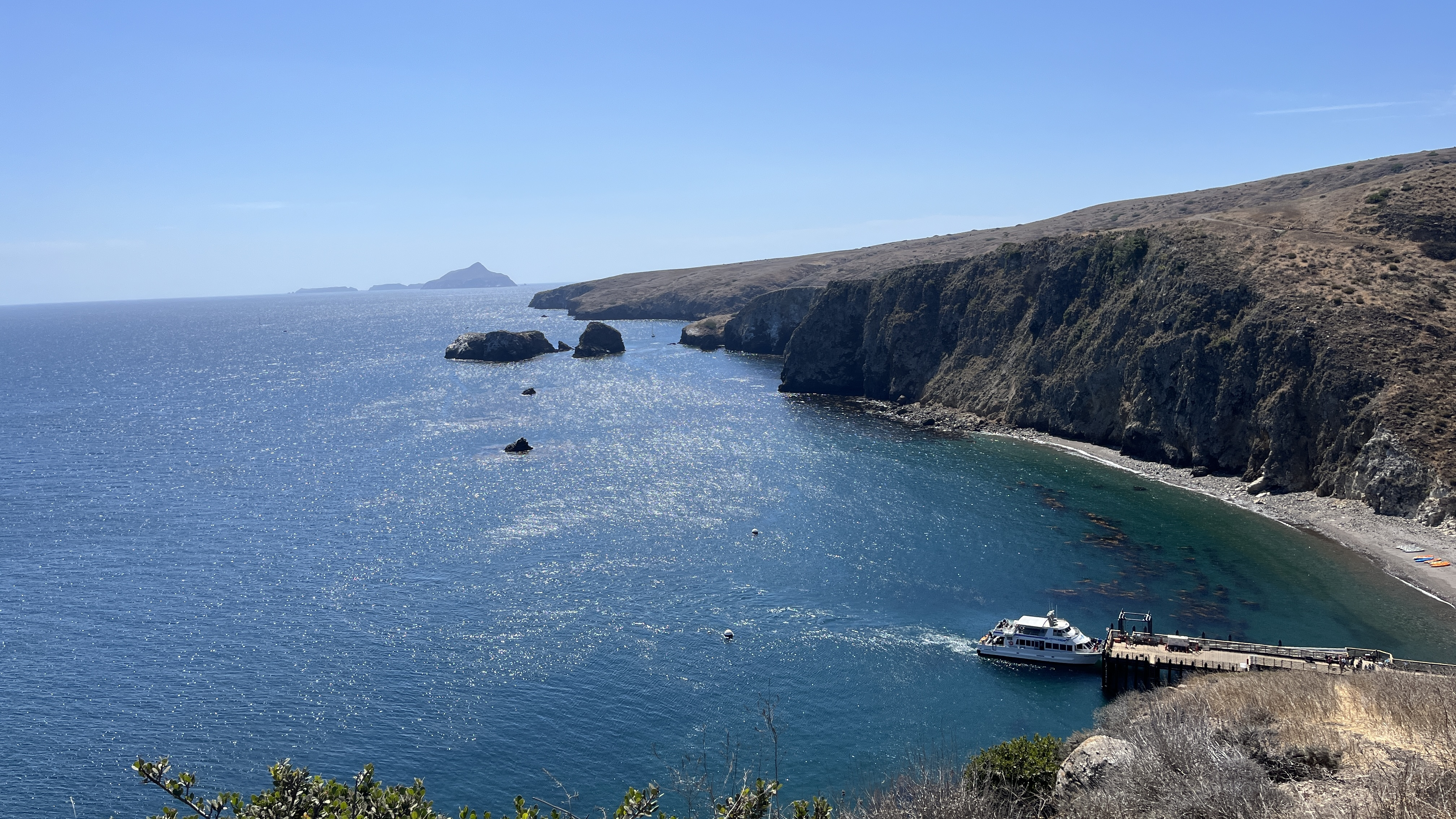
A ferry docked at Santa Cruz Island

Channel Islands National Park recreational activities include backpacking, camping, day hiking, scuba diving, and spearfishing. Channel Islands National Park is renowned for its large number of complex, beautiful sea caves. Kayaking through the sea caves is popular.

Within the National Park, divers can also visit several wrecks, including the Grumman TBF Avenger and the SS Winfield Scott that are situated on the seafloor of Anacapa State Marine Reserve, on the north coast of Anacapa Island.

The Channel Islands can be reached by private boat, or the official concessionaire, Island Packers. Based on ocean conditions and ferry availability, Scorpion Anchorage on Santa Cruz Island is the most visited area in the park for day and camping visitors. Camping visitors arrive at Prisoners Harbor on the north shore and stay in the valley beyond. A new island visitor center opened at Scorpion Ranch on Santa Cruz Island on April 6, 2009.

Although most visitation occurs in the summer, migrating gray whales and spectacular wildflower displays attract visitors in the winter and spring. Autumn is an excellent time to travel to the park, as well as for diving, as the days are usually sunny, with minimal winds and clear ocean water.

It is recommended that inexperienced visitors use caution when visiting the national park due to changing ocean conditions in this unique ecosystem. The National Park Service authorizes a small number of guide and outfitter services.

Visitation includes about 30,000 visitors traveling to the islands and another 60,000 who sail within park waters.

== Gallery ==
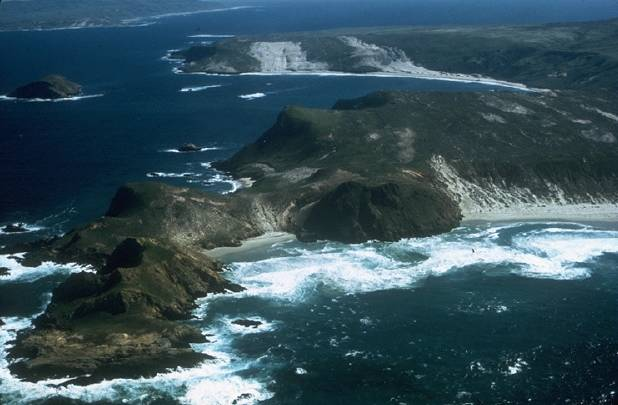
Channel Islands National Park

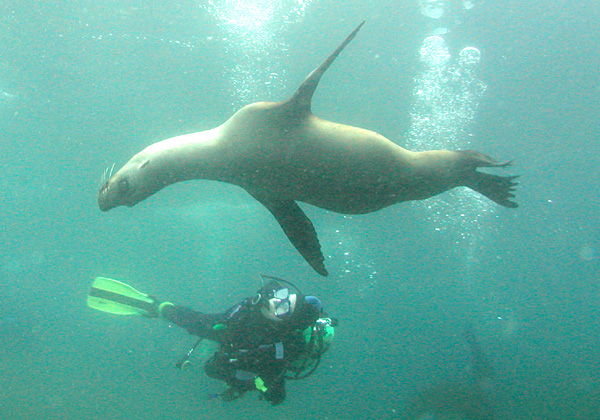
Diver and juvenile sea lions, Anacapa Island

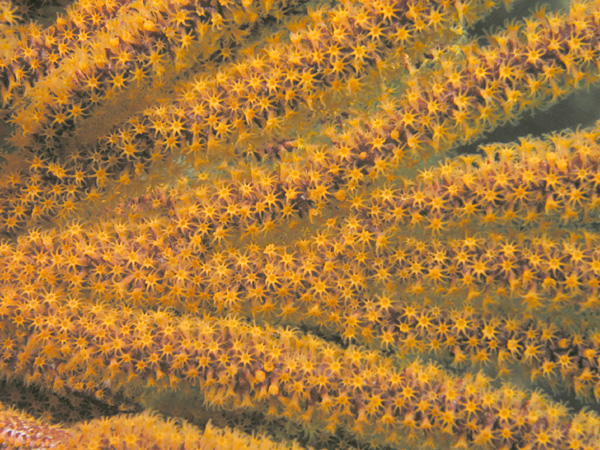
Sea fan, Anacapa Island

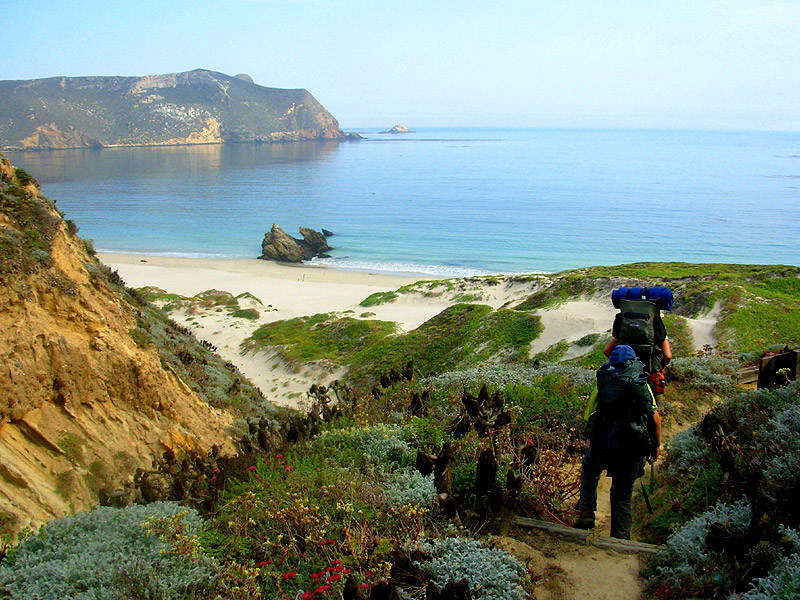
San Miguel Island

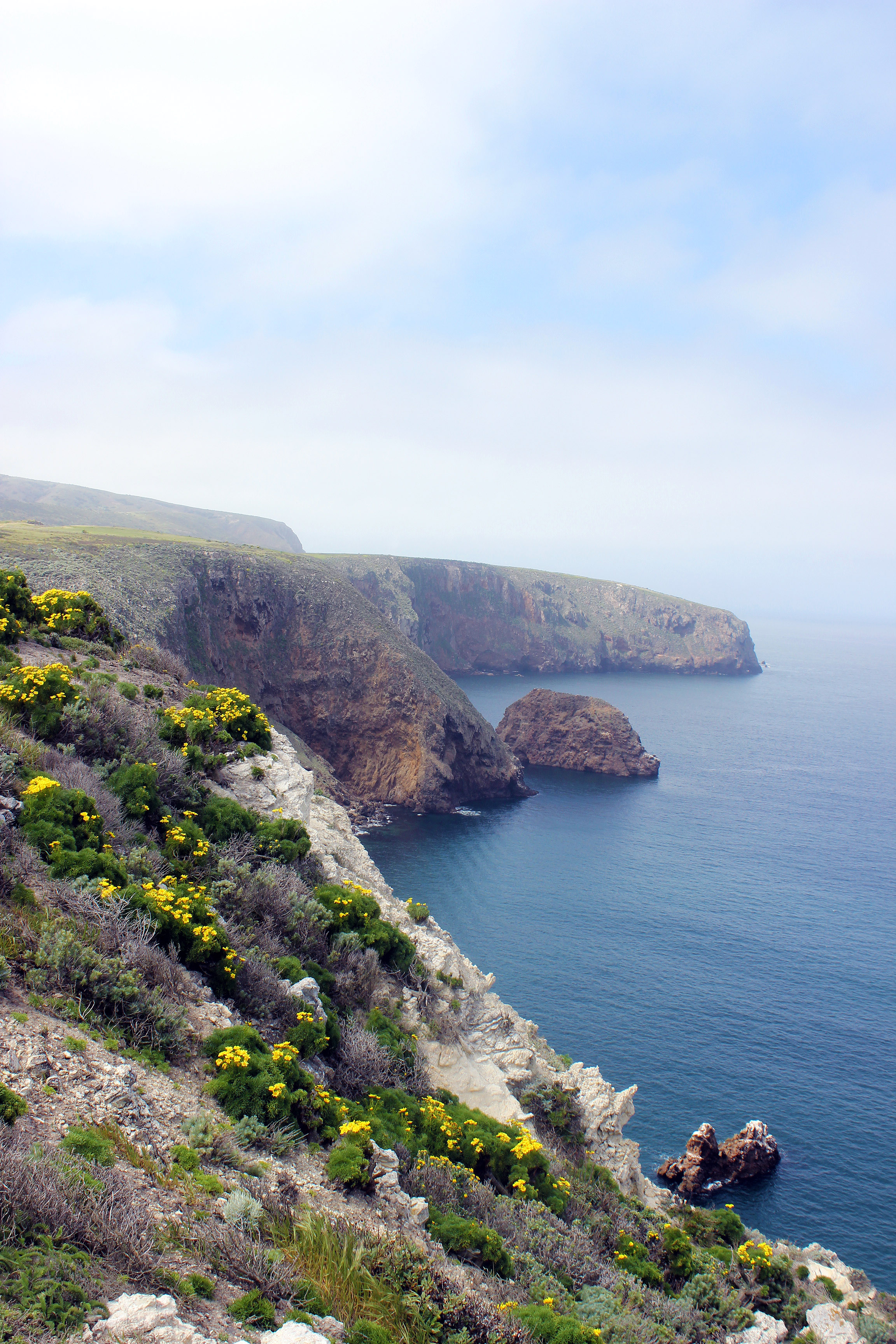
Santa Cruz Island in the spring.

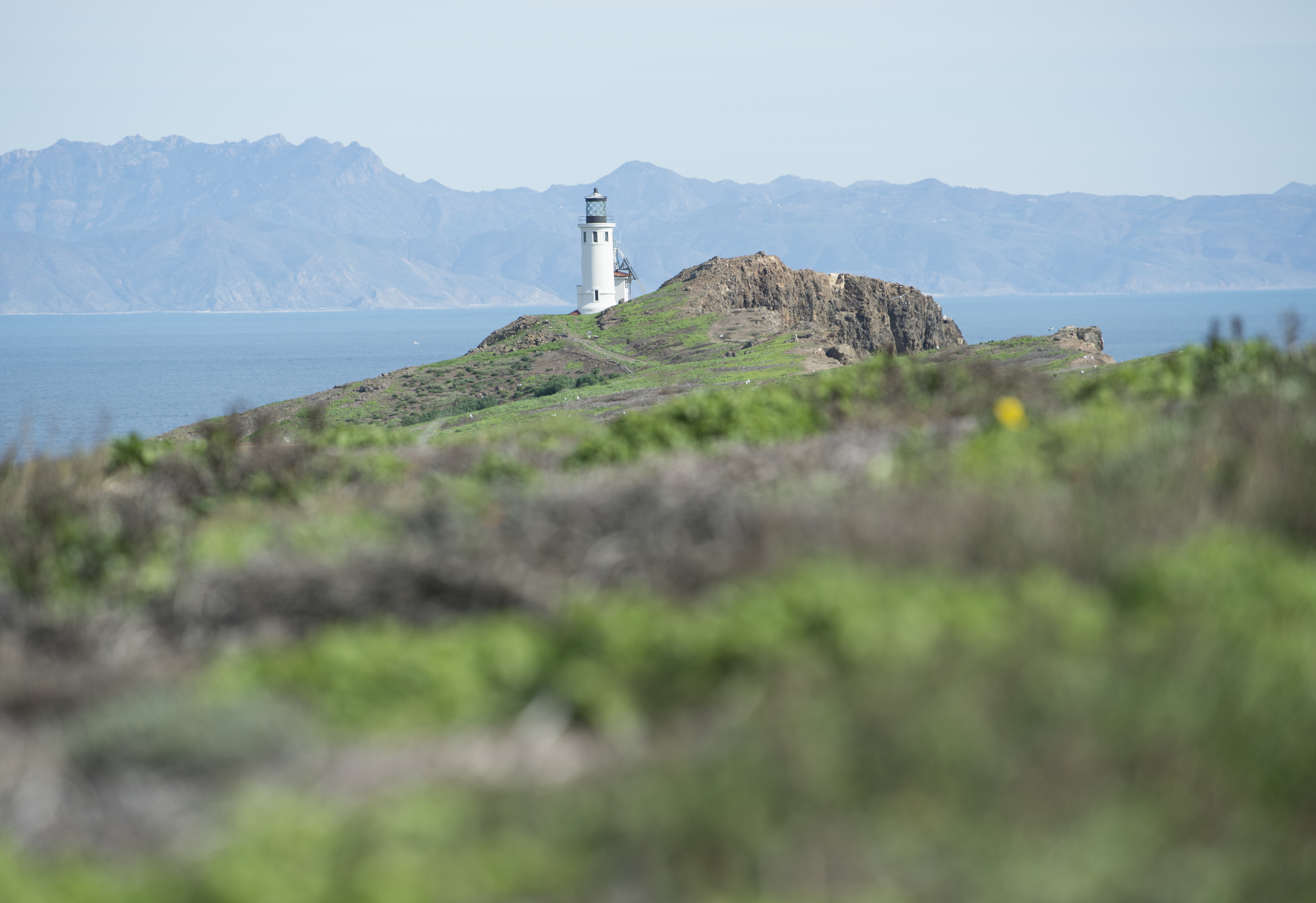
Anacapa Island Light viewed from the west side of the island

=== Vessels ===
The CINP unit operates several vessels in the waters of the park, including the following:

- Surf Ranger LCM-8 landing craft, 74 ft.
- research diving boat Pacific Ranger 56 ft.
- Sea Ranger II 58 ft.
- Ocean Ranger 100 ft.
- Sea Ranger 41 ft (retired).

== See also ==
- California coastal sage and chaparral ecoregion
- Channel Islands of California
- List of California Channel Islands wildlife
- List of national parks of the United States
- National parks in California
- When the Killing's Done – a novel by T.C.Boyle
