= Anacapa Island Light =

Lighthouse in California, United States

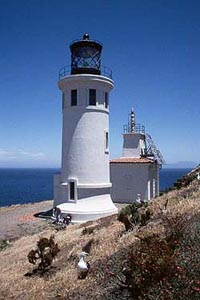
- Location: Anacapa Island; Ventura County; California; United States
- Coordinates: 34.015827°N 119.359548°W

Tower
- Constructed: 1912 (first)
- Built by
- Foundation: brick and concrete base
- Construction: reinforced concrete tower
- Automated: 1968
- Height: 55 feet (17 m)
- Shape: cylindrical tower with balcony and lantern
- Markings: white tower, black lantern
- Power source: solar power
- Operator: Channel Islands National Park
- Heritage: National Register of Historic Places listed place
- Fog signal: blast every 15s.

Light
- First lit: 1932 (current)
- Focal height: 277 feet (84 m)
- Lens: Third order Fresnel lens (original), DCB-24 aerobeacon (current)
- Range: 20 nmi (37 km; 23 mi)
- Characteristic: Fl (2) W 60s.
- Anacapa Island Light Station
- U.S. National Register of Historic Places
- U.S. Historic district
- Nearest city: Oxnard, California
- Area: 40 acres (16 ha)
- Built: 1932
- Architect: Lippman, M.W.
- Architectural style: Mission/spanish Revival
- MPS: Light Stations of California MPS
- NRHP reference No.: 91001101 (original); 100010729 (increase)

Significant dates
- Added to NRHP: September 3, 1991
- Boundary increase: August 22, 2024

Anacapa Island Lighthouse is a lighthouse in California, United States, on the entrance to Santa Barbara Channel, California. Constructed in 1912, it was the last major light station built on the west coast. Anacapa and several other islands were collectively designated as Channel Islands National Monument in 1938, though the Coast Guard retained responsibility for the Anacapa lighthouse. Now fully automated and unmanned, the light house still operates, but the National Park Service (NPS) is responsible for Channel Islands National Park.

Anacapa Island is noted now for an environmental restoration program devised by the NPS to exterminate the large population of non-native rats which infested the island and was making significant inroads on native species. The program, which began in 2003, selectively killed off the invaders with few adverse effects on the non-targeted native wildlife species. By 2014, after careful examination of the island, NPS could declare it rat-free.

== History ==
Positioned at the eastern entrance to the Santa Barbara Channel, Anacapa was a natural choice for a lighthouse. The Lighthouse Board decided to place a light on the island, but to limit the expense of building an offshore beacon, an unmanned acetylene lens lantern on a tower was erected in 1912. In 1932, the current permanent light station was built on the island, and was the last major light station to be built on the west coast. The 39-foot (12 m) tower and fog signal were built on the highest point of the island. In 1938, under the direction of Franklin D. Roosevelt, Santa Barbara and Anacapa Islands became Channel Islands National Monument. The United States Coast Guard automated the station in 1966. In 1980, Congress designated five of the eight Channel Islands, Anacapa, Santa Cruz, Santa Rosa, San Miguel, and Santa Barbara Islands, and 125,000 acres (51,000 ha) of submerged lands as Channel Islands National Park. The lighthouse is still an active aid to navigation.

Historical Information from Coast Guard web site:

Anacapa, a native-American word meaning "ever changing", was first discovered by Juan Rodríguez Cabrillo in 1542. The islands were called Las Mesitas or the Little Tables by De Portola in 1769. Captain George Vancouver renamed them Anacapa from the Canalino Indian name of Enecapah. Anacapa Island is really a chain of three small islets extending four and a half miles from east to west. The easternmost island is one mile (1.6 km) long, a quarter of a mile wide, and rises 250 feet (76 m) above the water. Middle Island is one and a half miles long, a quarter of a mile wide and 325 feet (99 m) at its highest point. The western, and largest island of this group, is two miles (3 km) long by six tenths of a mile wide, and rises to a peak of 930 feet (280 m). Anacapa’s 40-foot (12 m) lighthouse tower and adjacent foghorn building are located on East Anacapa. Her radiant 1.1 million candlepower light beacon, her bellowing foghorn and beeping radio signal have guided ships safely through the coastal channel since 1932, the date of construction. Prior to that an unattended light placed on the island in 1912 served as a guiding beacon for sailing vessels. A one tenth second of white light, 11-9/10 second of darkness, one-tenth second of light, 11-9/10 second of darkness, one tenth second of light, 35.9 seconds of darkness. This is the visual voice of Anacapa Island Light Station. The foghorn, a diaphragm-type horn, groans one two second blast then is silent for two seconds, blasts again for two seconds and then completes the cycle with 14 seconds of silence during low visibility. Electronic equipment sends out a continual radio beacon signal with a range of 12 miles (19 km). The Coast Guardsmen and their families of the light station resided in the four large Spanish style white stucco houses with red tile roofs before the light station was automated in December, 1968.

== Current usage ==
The buildings other than the lighthouse are now being utilized by the National Park Service.

== Geography ==
Anacapa is the smallest and the nearest of the Channel Islands to the mainland. It is 9 miles (14 km) across the Santa Barbara Channel from the nearest point on the mainland. It lies southwest of the city of Ventura.

== Image gallery ==
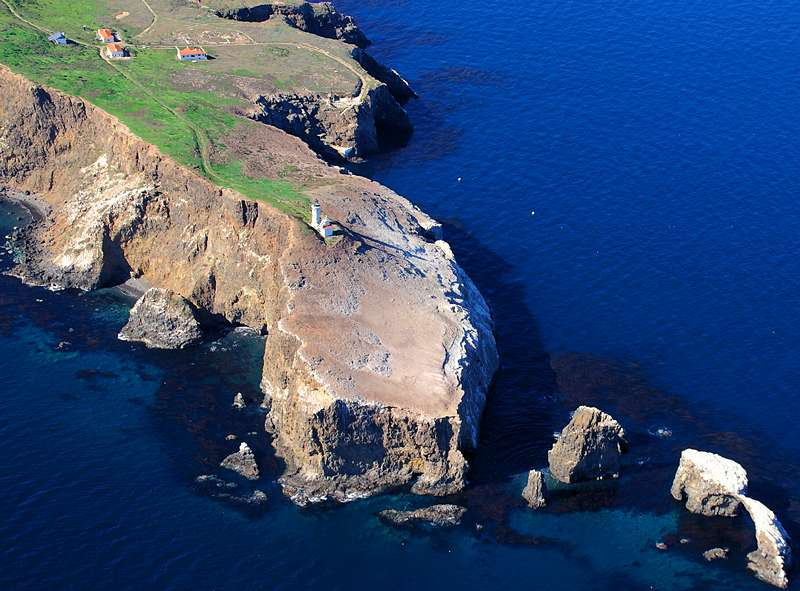
Aerial photo 2009

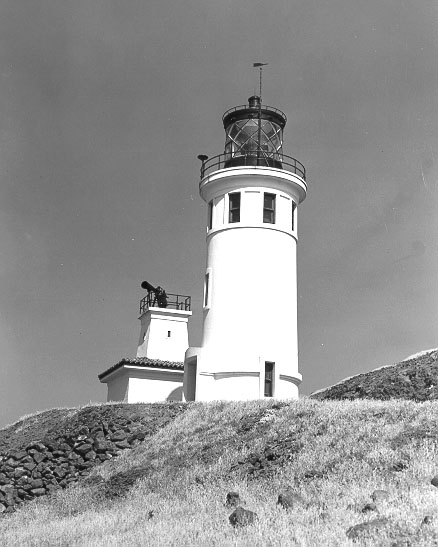
U.S. Coast Guard archive photo.

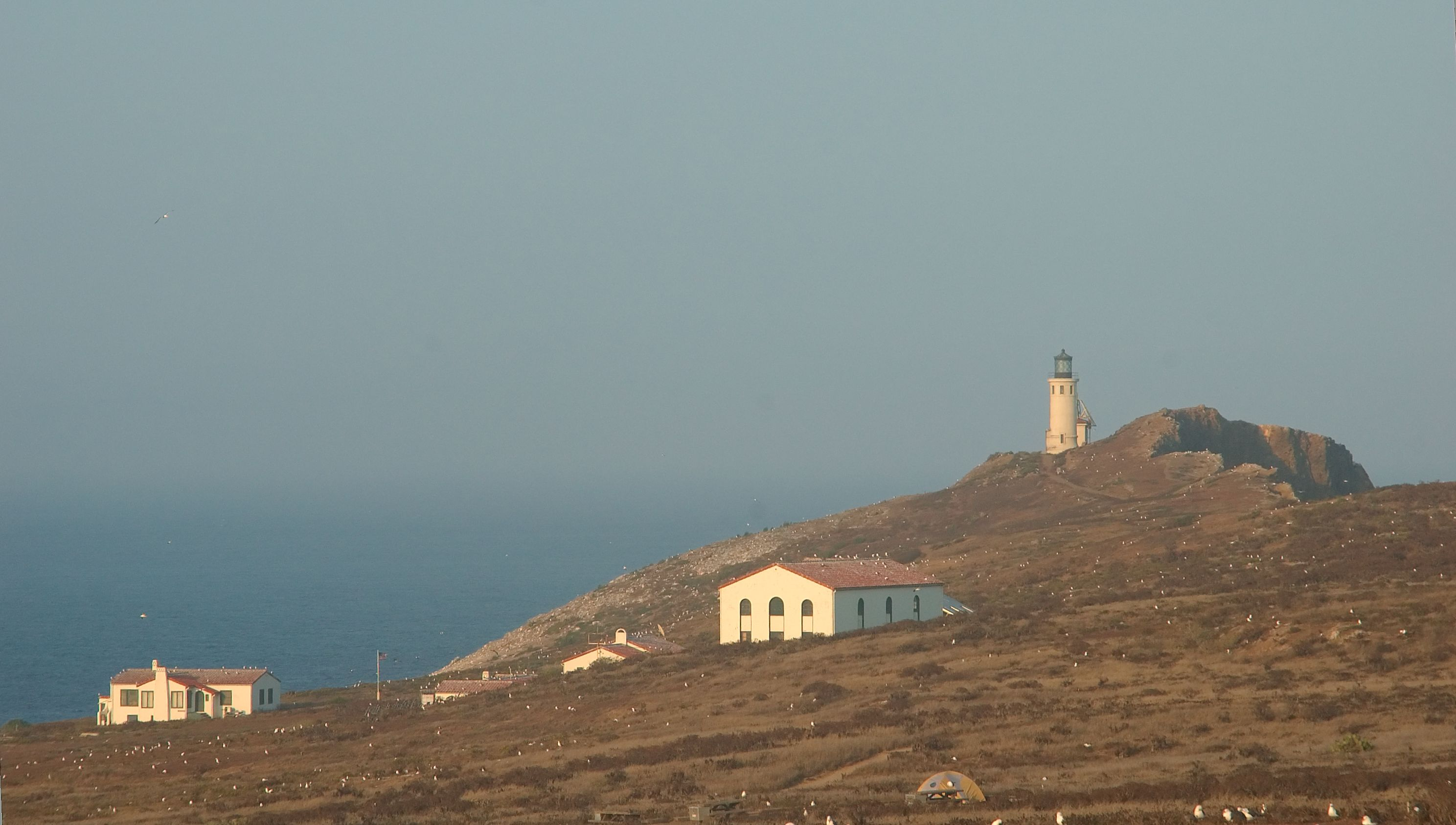
Lighthouse and National Park structures at sunset.

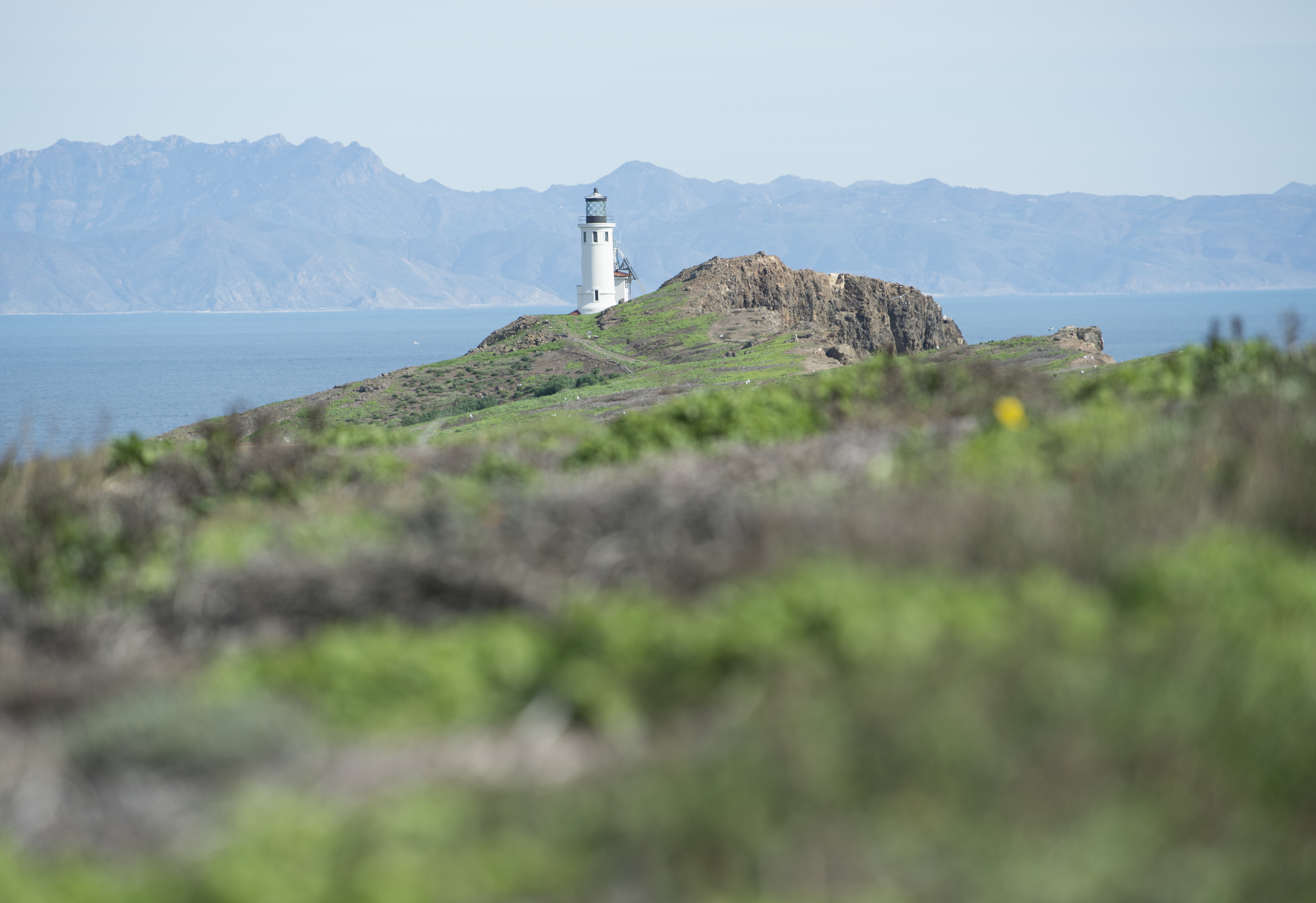
Looking across Santa Barbara Channel towards mainland, 2019.

== See also ==
- List of lighthouses in the United States
- National Register of Historic Places listings in Ventura County, California
