= Anacapa Island State Marine Reserve =

Marine reserve in the United States

- IUCN category Ia (strict nature reserve)
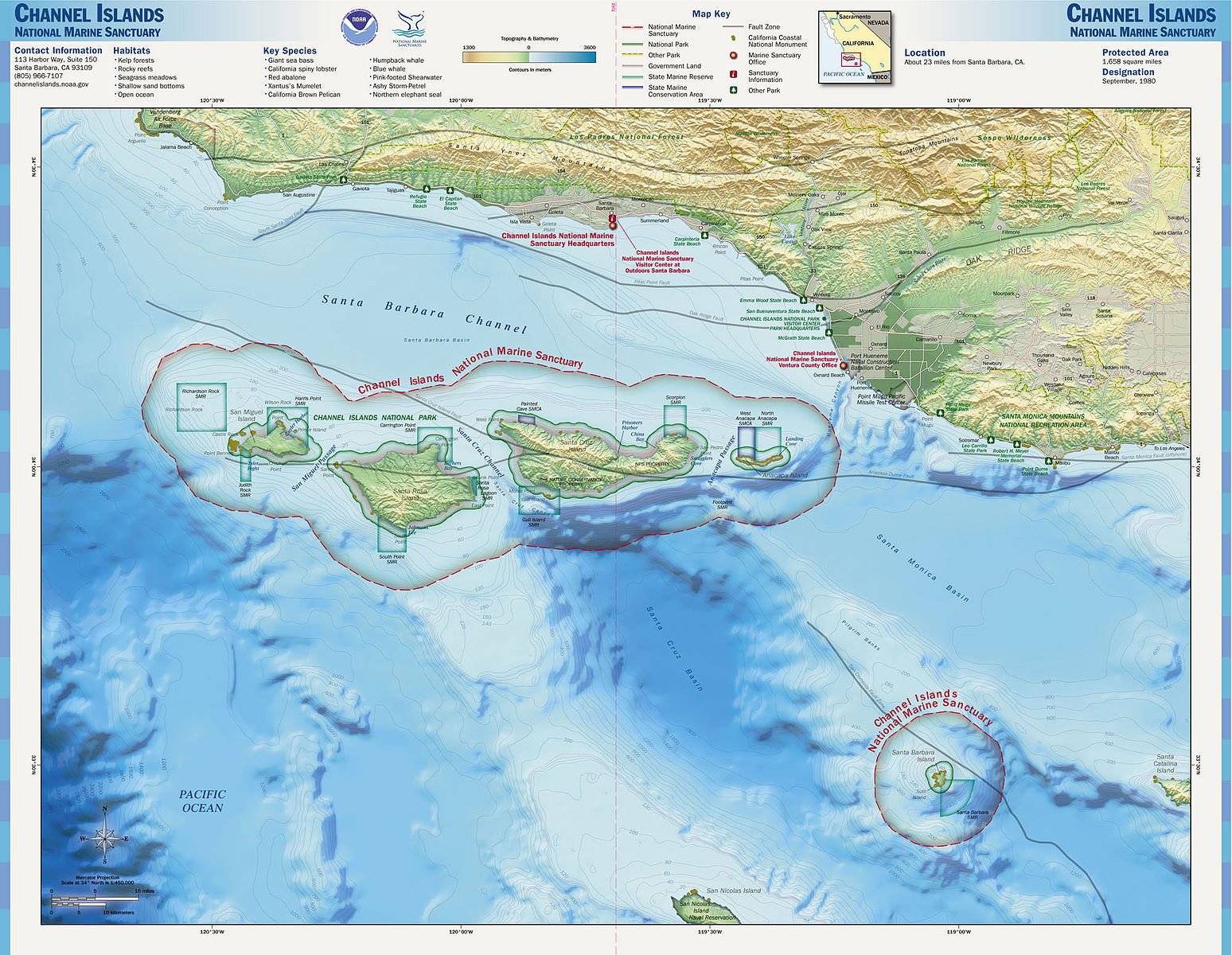
- Map of Channel Islands National Marine Sanctuary, which overlaps Channel Islands National Park and includes Anacapa State Marine Reserve

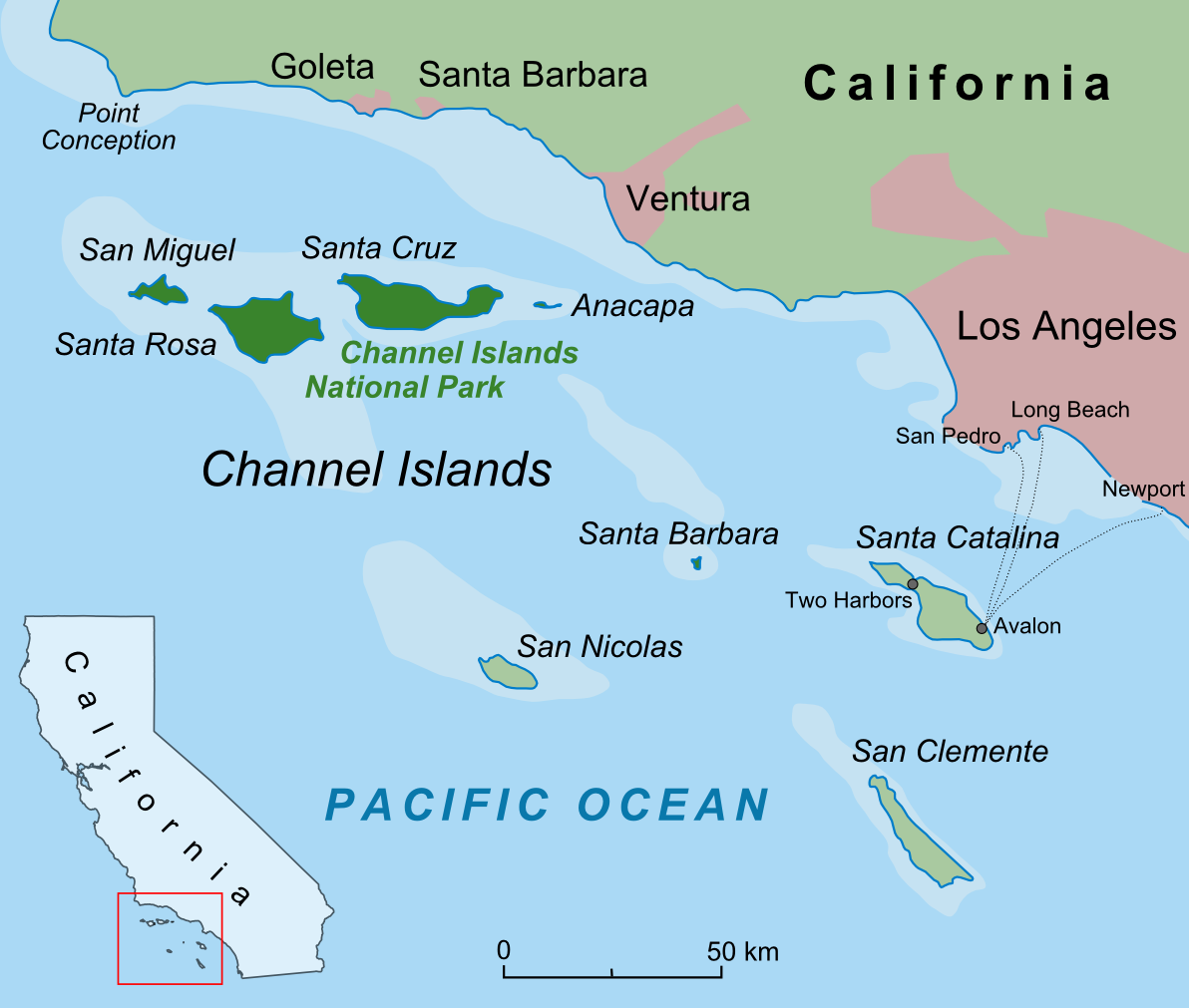
- Location within USA California Channel Islands Location within southern California
- Location: Ventura County, California, United States
- Coordinates: 34°02′N 119°23′W
- Length: 3.1 miles (5.0 km)
- Area: 11.55 square miles (29.9 km^{2})
- Elevation: 0–709 feet (0–216 m) below sea level
- Established: 2003
- Governing body: California Department of Fish and Wildlife
- Website: wildlife.ca.gov/Conservation/Marine/MPAs/Anacapa-Island

The Anacapa Island State Marine Reserve (SMR) is a protected marine reserve located off the coast of Southern California, encompassing the area of water immediately north of Anacapa Island. Established to safeguard the marine ecosystems and biodiversity of the region, the reserve is one of the thirteen Marine Protected Areas (MPAs) of the larger Channel Islands National Park network.

Anacapa State Marine Reserve covers an area of 11.55 square miles (29.9 km^{2}) and has a shoreline span of 3.1 miles (5.0 km). The reserve protects sandy beaches, extensive rocky shores, surf grass beds, kelp forests, deep offshore sand, and rocky seafloor to depths greater than 700 feet (210 m) below sea level. The reserve includes a Special Closure area of approximately 1 square mile (2.6 km^{2}) to protect seabirds and marine species.

== Location ==
Anacapa State Marine Reserve (SMR) is located in Ventura County, California off the north coast of Anacapa Island, the smallest of the northern islands of the Channel Islands archipelago. Anacapa State Marine Reserve is approximately 11 miles (18 km) from the urbanized coast of Southern California and the closest major city is Ventura. The waters of the Marine Reserve cover the north coast of Anacapa Island from Arch Rock, a coastline natural arch at the extreme east point of East Anacapa, to Tidepools, on the east part of West Anacapa. The reserve is one of the four Marine Protected Areas (MPAs) that are situated on the north side of Anacapa Island. The reserve shares a northern border with the Federal Anacapa Island Marine Reserve (FMR) and a western border with the Anacapa Island State Marine Conservation Area (SMCA) and the Federal Anacapa Island Marine Conservation Area (FMCA).

Anacapa Island and the neighbouring Santa Cruz Island, Santa Rosa Island and Santa Barbara Island are part of the Channel Islands National Park. Anacapa State Marine Reserve is also encompassed in the Channel Islands National Marine Sanctuary, which is an area that protects determined marine ecosystems within the United States waters.

The defined area of the Anacapa State Marine Reserve forms a square with corners at the following GPS coordinates: 34° 04.998′ N. lat., 119° 24.600′ W. long.; 34° 04.998′ N. lat., 119° 21.400′ W. long.; 34° 03.870′ N. lat., 119° 21.400′ W. long.; 34° 03.726′ N. lat., 119° 24.600′ W. long.

== Establishment ==
According to the 2009 George Wright Society Conference, before 2003 the area of Anacapa State Marine Reserve was protected by the Anacapa Ecological Reserve.

In 1998, a proposal regarding the establishment of marine protected areas was submitted by a group of recreational fishermen. A community-based plan, directed by the Channel Islands National Marine Sanctuary and the California Department of Fish and Game, was organised to design a network of MPAs. This group of stakeholders was called the Marine Reserves Working Group (MRWG) and included members of the public, government agencies, fisheries representatives, and conservation groups. With the support of data related to the benefits of the former Anacapa Ecological Reserve, the reserve network was implemented in April 2003. Anacapa Island State Marine Reserve, which incorporated the smaller Anacapa Ecological Reserve, was established as a Marine Protected Areas and re-established as part of the statewide MPA Network in 2012.

== Regulations ==
As part of the United States National System of Marine Protected Areas, Anacapa State Marine Reserve is a designated area primarily established to safeguard and preserve marine life in marine or estuarine waters. California's MPA Network comprises 124 areas with different degrees of protection, along with 14 Special Closures, all aimed at safeguarding the marine ecosystems of the state. California Marine Protected Areas (MPAs) were established to situate them strategically close to each other, forming an interconnected network. This network serves as a means to safeguard the uninterrupted movement of life within marine ecosystems. Each MPA within this network has unique goals and rules. Non-consumptive activities, scientific research, monitoring efforts, and educational endeavours may be authorized within these designated areas.

=== Recreational and commercial fishing restrictions ===
Activities such as fishing and collecting are strictly prohibited within Anacapa Island State Marine Reserve, which is regarded as one of the most protected MPAs in the region. A range of specific activities are illegal, except under a scientific collecting license for a national reserve, with commission approval or as a result of explicitly sanctioned fishing:

- harming, destroying, seizing, or taking control of marine species
- releasing fish or wildlife
- introducing plant species
- the use of fishing gear, including when anchored
- feeding fish and wildlife

Vessels are permitted to navigate through Anacapa State Marine Reserve while carrying a catch, and anchoring with a catch is allowed in designated areas.

Public safety activities are permitted within Anacapa State Marine Reserve, including the installation, maintenance, and temporary placement/removal of structures related to safety concerns.

=== Maritime routes restrictions ===
Anacapa State Marine Reserve is susceptible to specific marine navigation closures, encompassing an area of approximately one square mile, to minimize the disturbance of seabirds and marine mammals.

== Local Fauna ==
=== Marine Inhabitants ===
The primary goal of Anacapa Island State Marine Reserve is to preserve the rich and varied marine ecosystem where the convergence of tropical warm water currents and frigid currents from Alaska creates a unique and abundant environment that serves as feeding and refuge grounds for numerous species. Several species of fish are protected within the kelp forests spanning the MPAs and Special Closure. These include California sheephead, Garibaldi (fish), Bat ray, Moray eel, Horn shark, Leopard shark, kelp bass (Paralabrax clathratus), brightly coloured Nudibranch (sea slugs), and Giant sea bass, among many others.

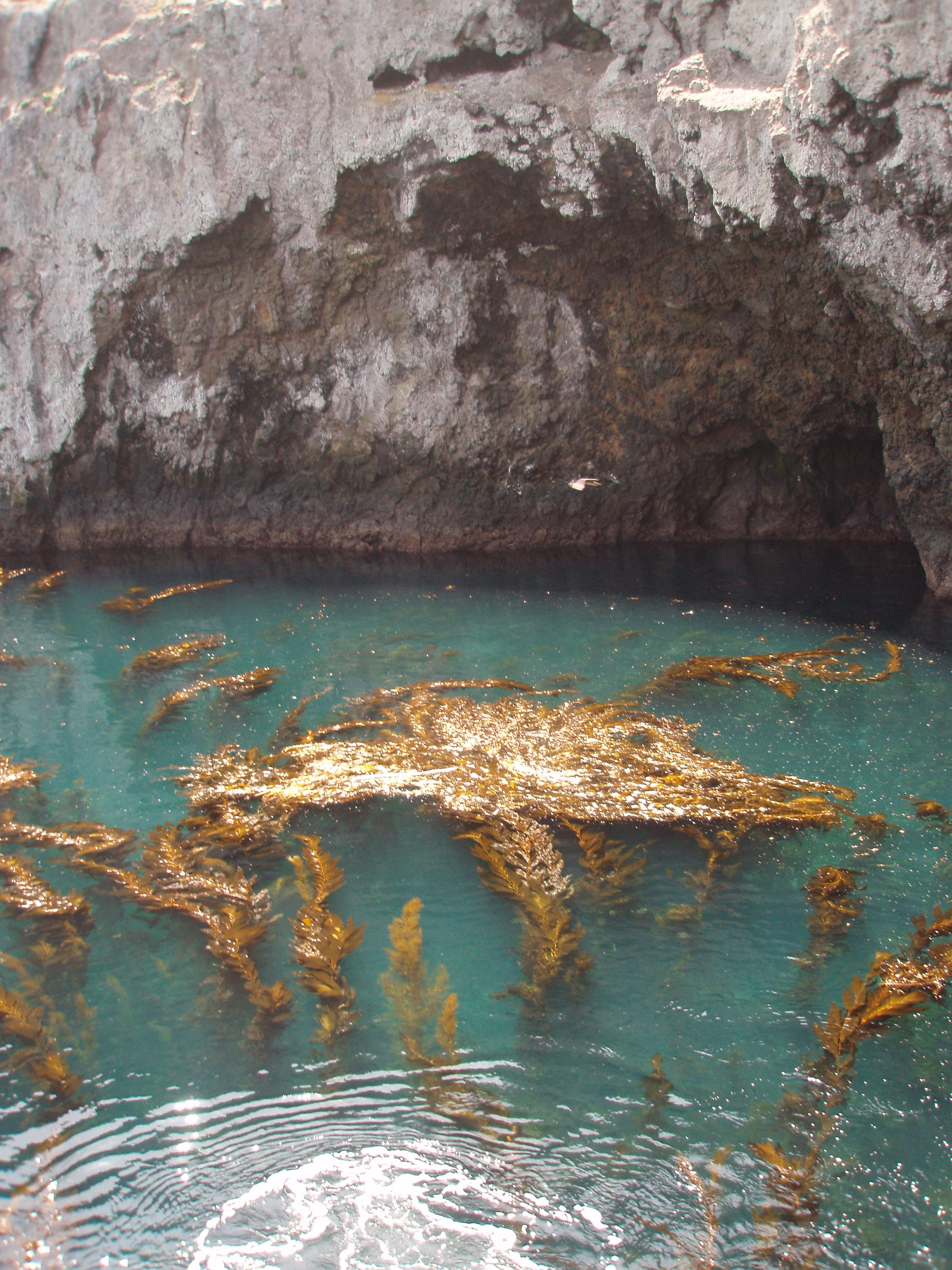
Giant kelp forest at Anacapa Island Landing Cove, part of Anacapa State Marine Reserve.

The cold and dark ocean depths of the reserve provide the optimal environmental conditions for the growth of corals, sponges and invertebrates. The latter have an important role within the ecosystem of the territory. They have a three-dimensional shape that creates the space where the local marine fauna live, grow, and reproduce. The survival of this marine species is at risk because of several factors related to pollution and human activities. While fishing certain groundfish species, there is a potential risk of the nets coming into contact with corals and sponges, inadvertently causing damage. Additional threats include climate change, the extraction of gas and oil, submarine cables, and debris on the seabed. The Channel Islands National Park and Marine Sanctuary provide habitat for significant breeding populations of pinnipeds. In particular, the Anacapa State Marine Reserve is the natural habitat for a large number of California sea lion and Harbor seal. High populations are supported by the mixture of warm waters from Mexico and cold waters from Alaska that mitigate their habitat and bring a multitude of fish that they feed on. The dense kelp forest also provides food and shelter for these mammals.

The seafloor of the reserve is a habitat for numerous species of crabs, including the sheep crab (Loxorhynchus grandis). Numerous starfish and invertebrates live among the kelp, coral, and sponges of the reserve.

=== Birds ===
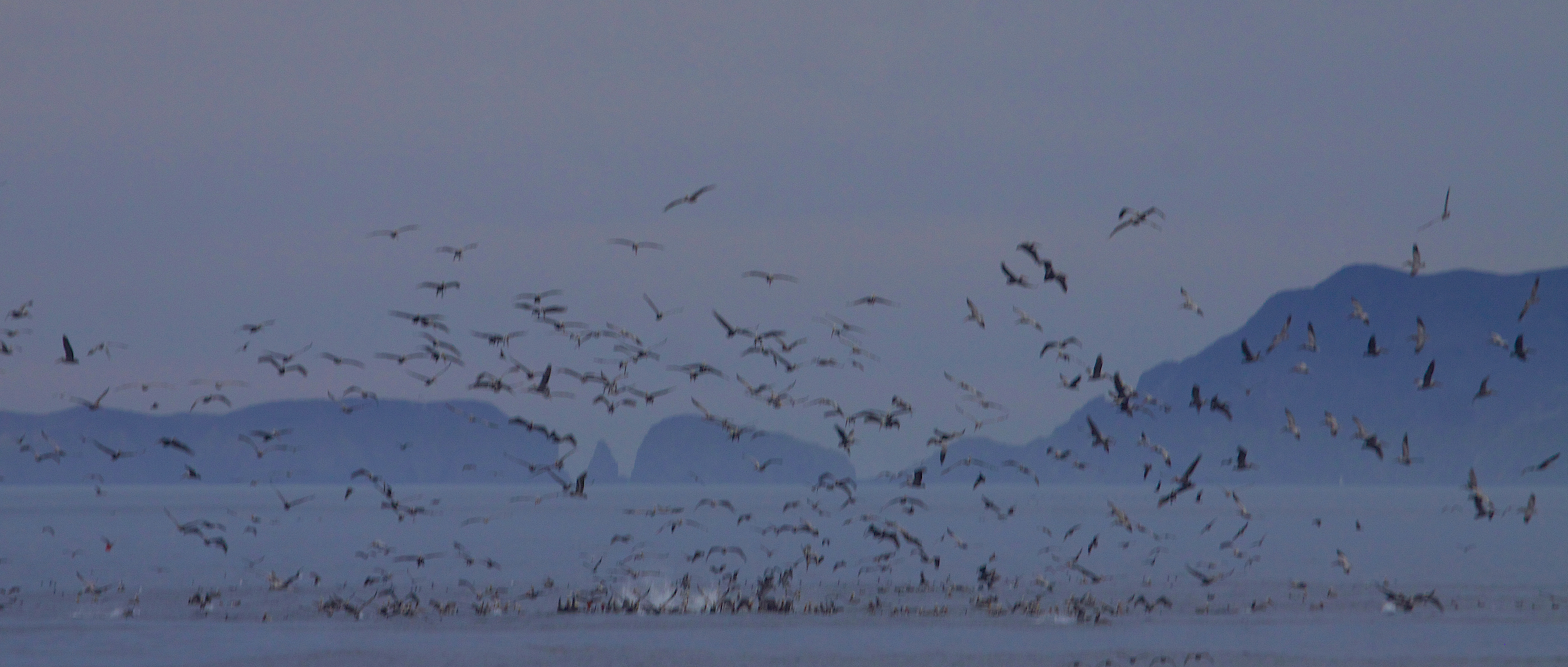
Brown Pelicans feeding in the waters of Anacapa Island.

Onshore, the rocky cliffs are surrounded by a Special Closure, which limits access to protect one of the world's largest breeding colonies of California Brown Pelican. Brown Pelicans and Brandt's cormorants swarm in the area. Several species of bird that once bred in the zone no longer do so, including the Rhinoceros Auklet and the Cassins Auklet.

=== Whales ===
Dolphins by Anacapa State Marine Reserve.

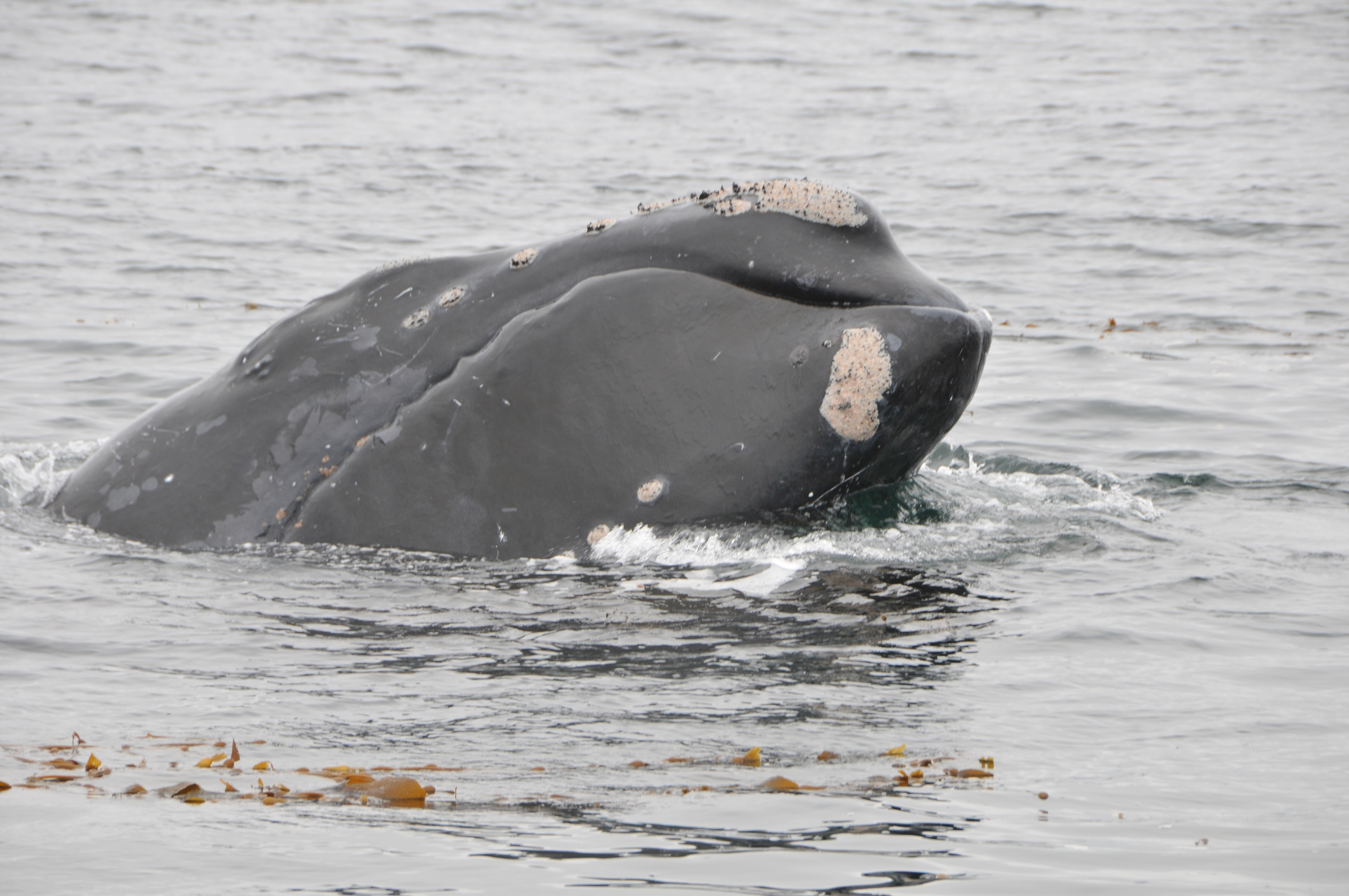
Single Gray Whale surfacing at Anacapa Island Special Closure

Anacapa SMR includes habitats for a range of cetaceans, including dolphins, porpoises, whales, and orcas. Whales are of major importance both for the natural ecosystem and the tourism economy of the territory. There are 27 different species of whales in the area, including blue whales, humpback whales, gray whales, fin whales, and pilot whales.

Anacapa State Marine Reserve is significant for its location on an important gray whale migration route. Gray whales spend their summers feeding in the nutrient-rich waters of the Arctic, and in September they start migrating south along the coastline to breed and calve in Baja California, Mexico. Between February and April, gray whales return on the northward journey. During this migration, gray whales cross the Santa Barbara Channel (also called the "migrant corridor") passing through Anacapa State Marine Reserve.

Gray whales are commonly sighted in the reserve from mid-to-late December through to mid-March, while blue and humpback whales are prevalent during the summer. Common dolphins can be observed throughout the entire year. Whale watching can be done both from shore or aboard boats.

== Management and Administration ==
Anacapa State Marine Reserve is one of the recipients of the Marine Life Protection Act, which dictated the necessity of monitoring and research concerning the status of marine fauna, habitat, and ecosystems. An assessment of the State Marine Reserve is required; this allows both the evaluation of the effectiveness of the Marine Protected Area and the making of informed management decisions.

=== Monitoring ===
The monitoring program of the MPAs is divided into two ecosystem-based phases: the Baseline Monitoring and the Long-Term Monitoring. Anacapa State Marine Reserve Baseline Monitoring took place from 2007 to 2018. Projects related to the Long-Term Monitoring were subsidized between 2019 and 2022.

Part of the research studies and monitoring of Anacapa State Marine Reserve is directed by the California Department of Fish and Wildlife, cooperatively with Channel Islands National Park and the Partnership for Interdisciplinary Studies of Coastal Oceans (PISCO). Abalone and sea urchins are the subject of study. The citizen-scientist group Reef Check California participates by offering help in the collection of data regarding rocky reefs, kelp forests, and fin fish.

Monitoring studies carried out by PISCO have shown a rise in the biomass of species in northern Channel Islands MPAs, which include Anacapa State Marine Reserve, in comparison with data from 2003.

== Research Studies ==
A range of research studies have been undertaken at Anacapa State Marine Reserve. From 2019 to 2021 Baited remote underwater video (BRUV) landers were used to measure the impact of fishing on the marine ecosystem.

The environmental DNA metabarcoding biomonitoring tool has been used in Anacapa State Marine Reserve and other MPAs to increase the frequency of monitoring and safety of personnel. By using the eDNA metabarcoding biomonitoring tool, personnel with neither diving experience nor taxonomic training may obtain comparable and possibly more thorough results than Scuba-based surveys.

A proposal to relocate groundfish to Anacapa State Marine Reserve from areas around oil platforms in the East Santa Barbara Channel has been tested using acoustic tagging of rockfish and lingcod. Although 75% of the trans-located fish remained in Anacapa SMR waters, the plan was not been implemented due to high costs and the proportion of lingcod which returned to their original habitat.

== Recreational Activities ==
Anacapa State Marine Reserve provides various sites for different marine-related activities and sports such as sea-kayaking, scuba diving, snorkeling, and swimming.

=== Scuba diving and snorkeling ===
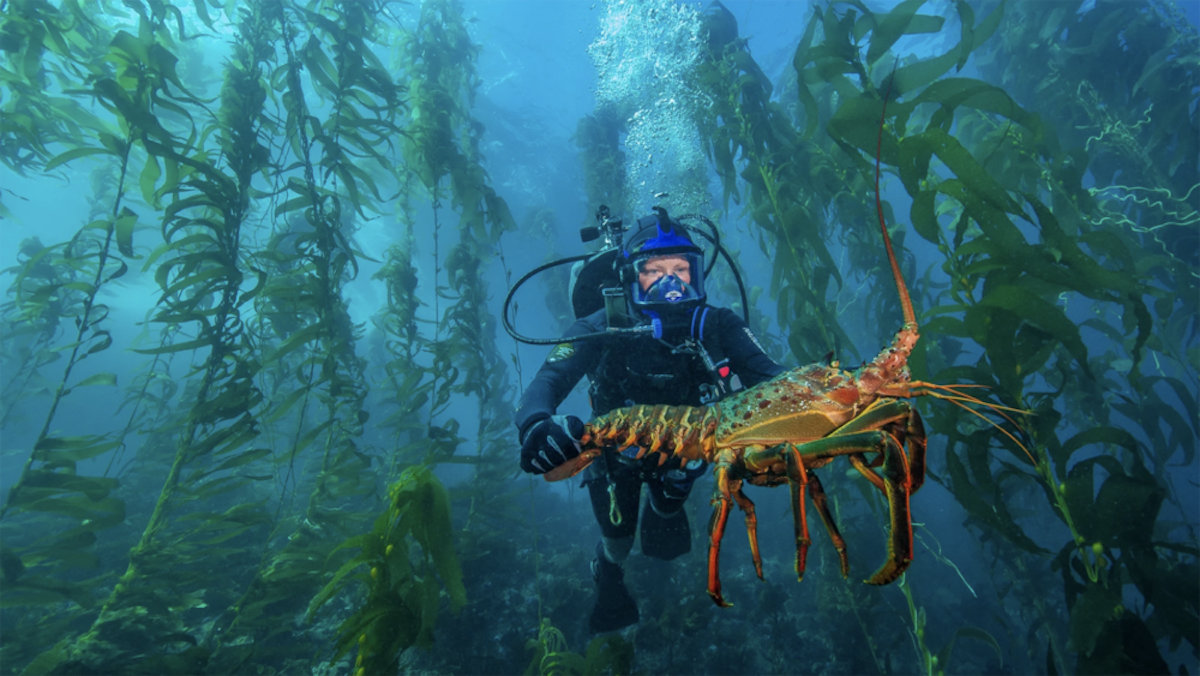
Diver holding a spiny lobster in the Anacapa State Marine Reserve's kelp forest.

The National Park Service allows boat trips to Anacapa Island. Boats depart from the cities of Ventura, and Oxnard. Numerous local dive companies offer excursions through the kelp forest, sea caves, and coves. Swimmers, snorkelers, and divers can see the variety of species of fish and vegetation of the Marine Reserve. Divers can explore several dive sites at depths ranging from 50–120 feet (15–37 m), with visibility averaging from 30–80 feet (9.1–24.4 m).

=== Wreck diving ===
The wreck of a Grumman TBF Avenger is situated within the Anacapa Marine Protected Area. It holds historical significance as a World War II United States Navy torpedo bomber. During a training exercise in the early 1950s, it collided with one of the other four aircraft in the formation, resulting in both planes crashing. The Avenger descended on the east side of Anacapa without any casualties. The other plane crashed on the opposite side of Anacapa, leading to loss of life, and the wreck site remains undiscovered. The wreck site of the Avenger is approximately 120 feet (37 m) deep and 40 feet (12 m) away from the reef. The wreck lies on the sand and retains its aircraft shape despite the passage of years. The wreckage has become a focal point for marine life, attracting various fish species. The wreck offers an opportunity for deep diving, with average visibility ranging from 20–60 feet (6.1–18.3 m).

Located within Anacapa SMR is the Winfield Scott wreck, the remains of a paddle steamer that sank in the Santa Barbara Channel in 1853.

=== Sea kayaking ===
Anacapa Island State Marine Reserve is a popular location for sea kayaking, with a shoreline characterised by cliffs, coves and numerous sea caves, including the iconic Arch Rock. Due to potentially strong currents along its shore, kayakers are warned to have moderate experience in ocean kayaking. The lack of an accessible beach for access and egress requires kayakers arriving by boat to lower and raise kayaks by rope from a landing dock.

=== Wildlife and birdwatching ===
Bird watching is a recreational activity offered by the State Marine Reserve due to the location of important nesting grounds for a substantial population of western gulls, Cassin's auklets, and Brandt's cormorants. The cliffs represent the sole nesting location for California brown pelicans along the West Coast of the United States and include the world's largest population of Scripps's murrelets.

=== Educational programs ===
Educational programs for students are provided by the Channel Islands National Park. During these programs, participants can learn more about marine and terrestrial ecosystems. Students targeted for these programs range from elementary school to high school. During the summer months, "Live Dives" are available, providing visitors with the opportunity to witness live underwater dives and explore the marine environment in real time. Visitors can watch underwater activities within the Marine Protected Area without diving by observing the underwater program directly from the shore. Park rangers descend into the kelp forest with dive masks featuring microphones and carrying cameras to capture the underwater scenery and provide explanations about the marine environment that they are recording.

== See also ==
- Anacapa Island Archeological District
- List of marine protected areas of California
- Channel Islands National Marine Sanctuary at Commons
- List of California Channel Islands wildlife
- List of national parks of the United States
- National parks in California
