= Carol Blanchette =

Marine scientist

- Education: Oregon State University
- Scientific career
- Thesis: The effects of biomechanical and ecological factors on population and community structure of wave-exposed, intertidal macroalgae (1994)

Carol Anne Blanchette is research biologist at the University of California, Santa Barbara who is known for her work on marine intertidal zones and the biomechanics of marine organisms.

== Education and career ==
Blanchette grew up in New Jersey and describes her lifelong interest with biology and science as a result of early interactions with her grandparents about fish and fishing. Blanchette has a B.S. from the University of Notre Dame (1988) and earned her Ph.D. in 1994 from Oregon State University. Following her Ph.D. she moved to California where she was first a postdoctoral scientist at Hopkins Marine Station and then later because a research biologist at the University of California, Santa Barbara. From 2000 until 2019, Blanchette was one of the principal investigators for the Partnership for Interdisciplinary Studies of Coastal Oceans (PISCO) where she led the team working on intertidal community ecology and biomechanics, and served as the science and policy coordinator. In 2016 Blanchette was named director of the Valentine Eastern Sierra Reserve.

== Research ==
Blanchette is known for her work on topics including biomechanics, intertidal ecology, and climate change. Blanchette's early research examined variability in where plants settle on rocky seashores and how plants survives waves on rocky seashores. She has worked on factors defining trophic cascades and the distribution of species such as mussels and other benthic organisms that are found in intertidal zones. She has worked on the loss of starfish, sea star wasting disease, along the western coast of the United States. By 2016 the sea stars were returning to the Oregon coast, and mirrored what Blanchette and her colleagues saw for recovery of sea stars in California. Blanchette's work also examines ocean acidification and the impact of climate change on marine intertidal zones.

== Selected publications ==
- Shurin, Jonathan B.; Borer, Elizabeth T.; Seabloom, Eric W.; Anderson, Kurt; Blanchette, Carol A.; Broitman, Bernardo; Cooper, Scott D.; Halpern, Benjamin S. (2002-11-07). "A cross-ecosystem comparison of the strength of trophic cascades: Strength of cascades". Ecology Letters. 5 (6): 785–791. doi:10.1046/j.1461-0248.2002.00381.x.
- Blanchette, Carol Anne (1997). "Size and Survival of Intertidal Plants in Response to Wave Action: A Case Study Withfucus Gardneri". Ecology. 78 (5): 1563–1578. doi:10.1890/0012-9658(1997)078[1563:SASOIP]2.0.CO;2. ISSN 0012-9658.
- Helmuth, Brian; Harley, Christopher D. G.; Halpin, Patricia M.; O'Donnell, Michael; Hofmann, Gretchen E.; Blanchette, Carol A. (2002). "Climate Change and Latitudinal Patterns of Intertidal Thermal Stress". Science. 298 (5595): 1015–1017. doi:10.1126/science.1076814. ISSN 0036-8075. PMID 12411702. S2CID 14385319.
- Borer, E. T.; Seabloom, E. W.; Shurin, J. B.; Anderson, K. E.; Blanchette, C. A.; Broitman, B.; Cooper, S. D.; Halpern, B. S. (2005). "What Determines the Strength of a Trophic Cascade?". Ecology. 86 (2): 528–537. doi:10.1890/03-0816. ISSN 0012-9658.
- Blanchette, Carol A.; Melissa Miner, C.; Raimondi, Peter T.; Lohse, David; Heady, Kristen E. K.; Broitman, Bernardo R. (2008). "Biogeographical patterns of rocky intertidal communities along the Pacific coast of North America". Journal of Biogeography. 35 (9): 1593–1607. doi:10.1111/j.1365-2699.2008.01913.x. hdl:10533/237538. S2CID 5565088.

== Awards and honors ==
In 2012 Blanchette was honored by the United States' Department of the Interior for her work with the Partnership for Interdisciplinary Studies of Coastal Oceans (PISCO).
