= California State Parks =

Department of the state government of California

Agency overview
- Formed: 1864 (First State Park); 1927 (Bureaucratic Forming)
- Headquarters: 715 P St, Sacramento, California
- Employees: 1,835.1 permanent staff, 1,543.5 seasonal (2022–2023)
- Annual budget: $1.367 billion (2025)
- Agency executive: Armando Quintero, Director
- Parent agency: California Natural Resources Agency
- Website: parks.ca.gov

The California Department of Parks and Recreation (CDPR), operating as California State Parks, is a department of the California Natural Resources Agency within the California state government. The system is the largest state park system in the United States.

California State Parks administers 279 separate park units on 1.4 million acres (5,700 km^{2}), with over 280 miles (450 km) of California coastline; 625 miles (1,006 km) of lake and river frontage; nearly 15,000 campsites; and 3,000 miles (4,800 km) of hiking, biking, and equestrian trails. Headquartered in Sacramento, park administration is divided into 21 districts.

== History ==
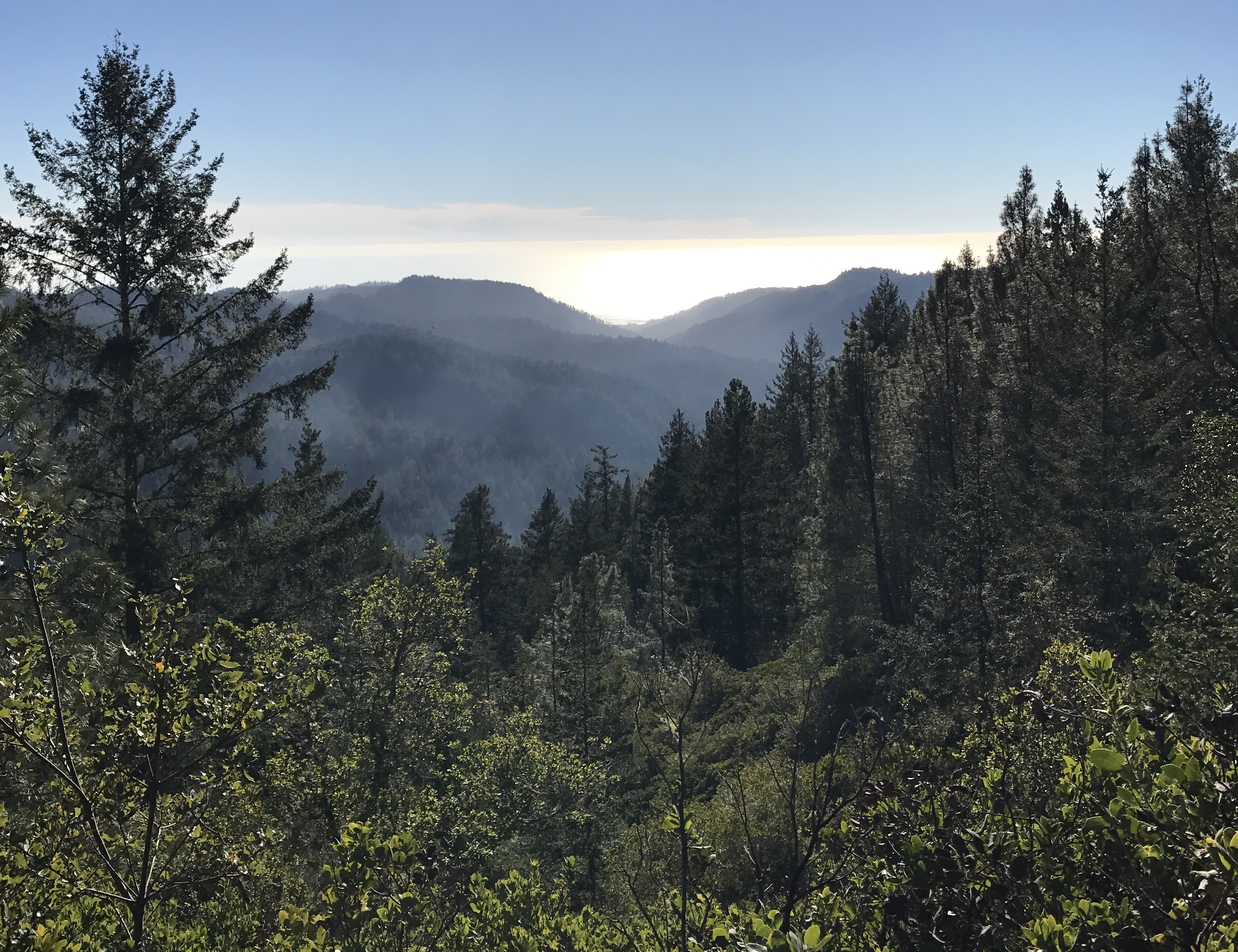
Big Basin Redwoods State Park, in the Santa Cruz Mountains, is the oldest state-run park, founded in 1902.

California's first state park was the Yosemite Grant, which today constitutes part of Yosemite National Park. In 1864, the federal government set aside Yosemite Valley for preservation and ceded the land to the state, which managed the famous glacial valley until 1906.

California's oldest state park, Big Basin Redwoods State Park, was founded in 1902. Until 1921, each park was managed by an independent commission or agency.

In 1927, the California Legislature, with the support of Governor C. C. Young, established the State Park Commission, and its original membership included: Major Frederick R. Burnham, W. F. Chandler, William E. Colby (Secretary), Henry W. O'Melveny, and Dr. Ray Lyman Wilbur. The following year, a newly established State Park Commission began gathering support for the first state park bond issue. Its efforts were rewarded in 1928 when Californians voted nearly three-to-one in favor of a $6 million park bond act. In addition, Frederick Law Olmsted Jr. completed a statewide survey of potential park lands that defined basic long-range goals and provided guidance for the acquisition and development of state parks. With Newton B. Drury (later to be named director of the National Park Service) serving as acquisition officer, the new system of state parks rapidly began to grow. William Penn Mott Jr. served as director of the agency under Governor Ronald Reagan.

In May 2008, the National Trust for Historic Preservation listed the park system as a whole on their list of America's Most Endangered Places.

On January 10, 2008, Governor Arnold Schwarzenegger's office announced that the California State Park System would consider indefinite closures of all or part of 48 specific individual parks (one in five) to help meet the challenges of the looming (projected) $14.5 billion deficit facing California for its 2008–2009 budget year. On September 25, 2009, Governor Schwarzenegger's office announced that all state parks would remain open during the 2009–2010 fiscal year using one-time budget reduction methods in maintenance, equipment, and services. A record wet winter in 2023 caused more than $210 million in storm damage to California's State Parks.

== Operation ==
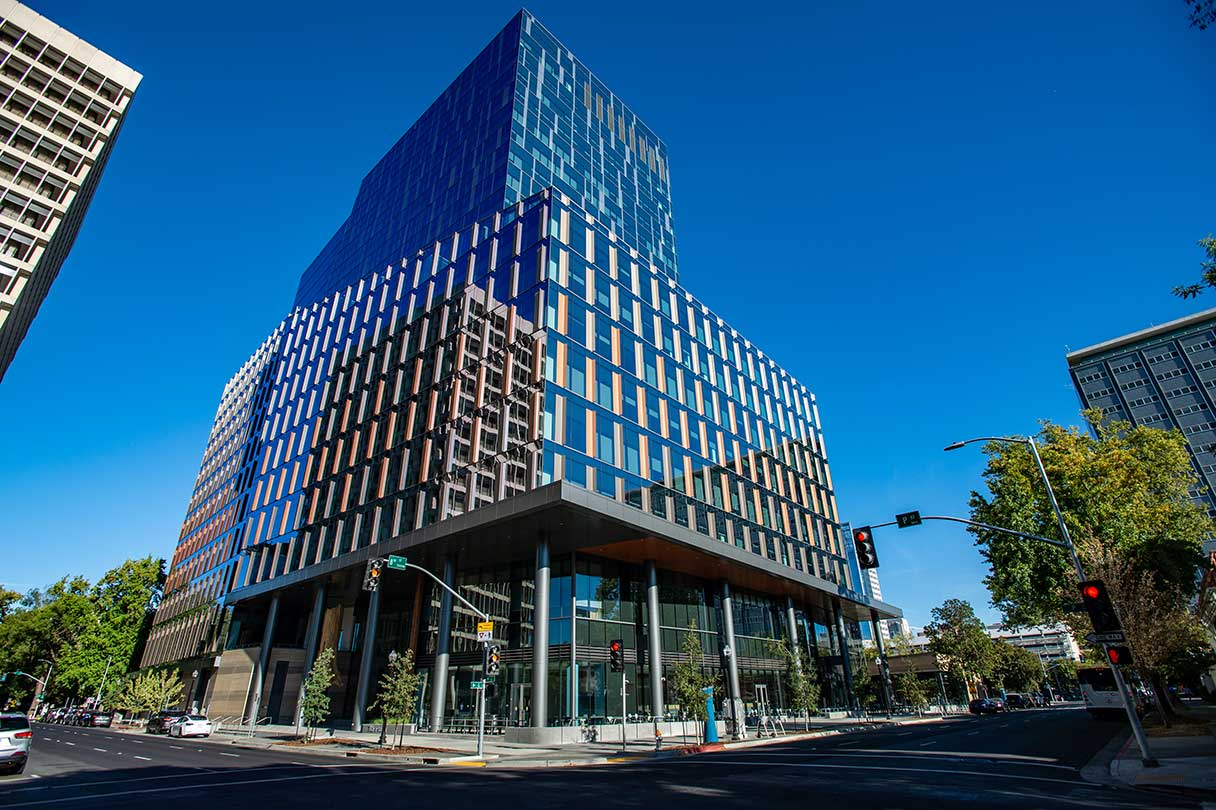
The California State Parks system is headquartered at the California Natural Resources Agency, in Sacramento.

Responsible for almost one-third of California's scenic coastline (280 miles), California State Parks manages the state's finest coastal wetlands, estuaries, beaches, and dune systems. California State Parks contains the largest and most diverse natural and cultural heritage holdings of any state agency in the nation. State park units include underwater preserves, reserves, and parks; redwood, rhododendron, and wildlife reserves; state beaches, recreation areas, wilderness areas, and reservoirs; state historic parks, historic homes, Spanish era adobe buildings, including museums, visitor centers, cultural reserves, and preserves; as well as lighthouses, caverns, ghost towns, water slides, conference centers, and off-highway vehicle parks.

These parks protect and preserve an unparalleled collection of culturally and environmentally sensitive structures and habitats, threatened plant and animal species, ancient Native American sites, historic structures and artifacts. The Department employs State Park Peace Officers Law Enforcement to protect and preserve the State Parks and the millions of people who visit them each year. Parks are patrolled by sworn State Park Peace Officers, of which there are two classifications, State Park Ranger and State Park Lifeguards.

California State Parks Peace Officers are the system's dedicated law enforcement agency.

Subdivisions of California State Parks include the California Office of Historic Preservation, Off-Highway Motor Vehicle Recreation Division, and the Boating & Waterways Division.

=== Parks Forward Commission ===
The Parks Forward Commission was formed after the California Legislature called for the formation of a multidisciplinary advisory council to conduct an independent assessment and make recommendations. The commission issued a report in 2015 that noted the lack of maintenance for many parks along with visitors who do not reflect the diversity of California's population. The report also said the agency is using outdated technology for managing the parks and providing reservations while being overwhelmed by the responsibility for managing the park system.

== Classification ==
The sites managed and preserved by the department are categorized into different types. There are 89 State Parks, 62 State Beaches, 51 State Historic Parks, 33 State Recreation Areas, 16 State Natural Reserves, 14 State Park Properties, 9 State Vehicular Recreation Areas, 2 State Marine Reserves, 1 State Historical Monument, 1 State Seashore, and 1 Wayside Campground.

The Public Resources Code provides the classification of units of the state park system. All units that are or will become part of the system, except those units or parts of units designated by the state legislature as wilderness areas or are subject to any other provision of law are classified by the State Park and Recreation Commission into one of these classifications.

=== State Park ===
State Parks "consist of relatively spacious areas of outstanding scenic or natural character, oftentimes also containing significant [...] values. State recreation units "consist of areas selected, developed, and operated to provide outdoor recreational opportunities" and are classified as either State Recreation Areas, Underwater Recreation Areas, State Beaches, and Wayside Campgrounds.

State Parks in California

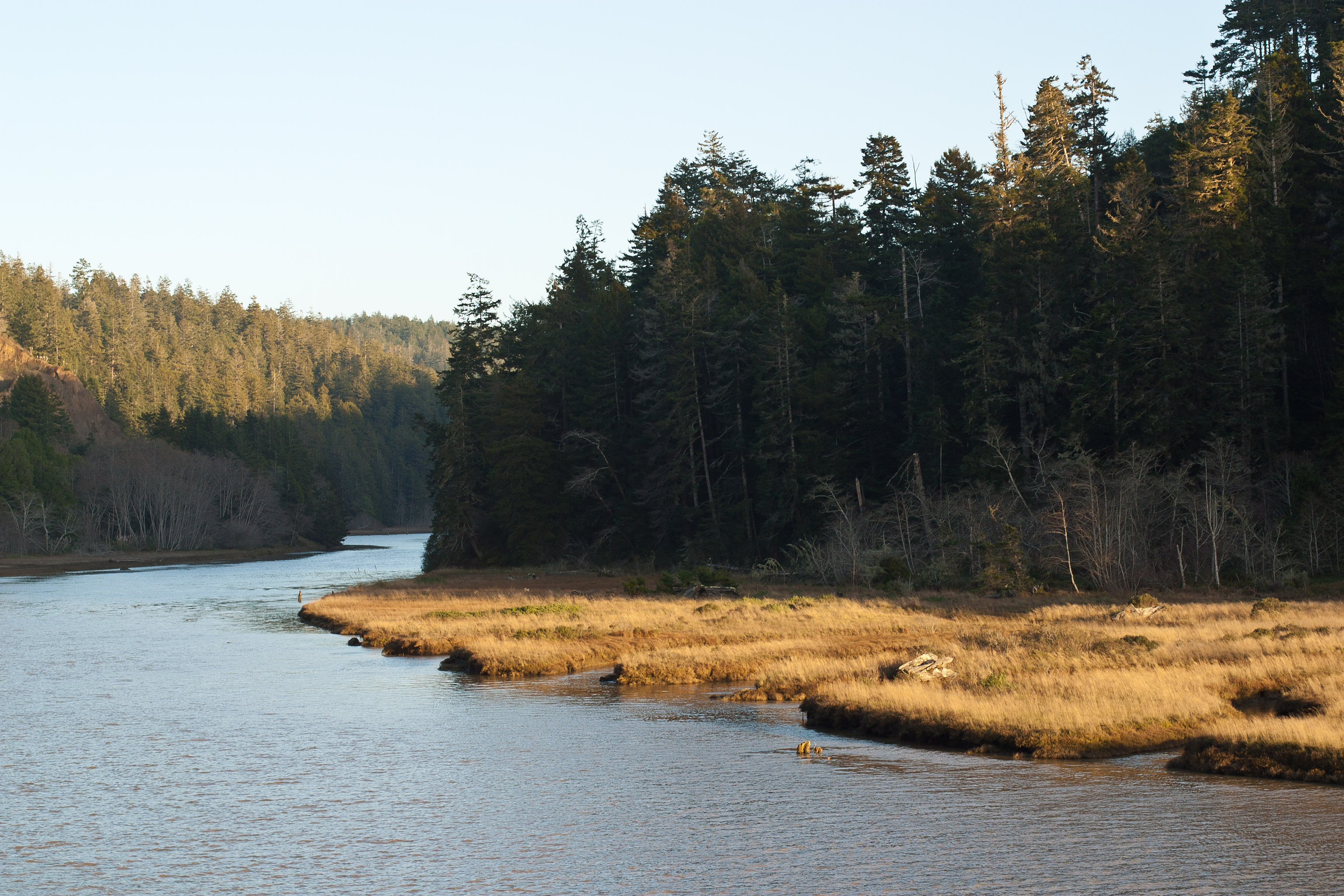
Mendocino Headlands

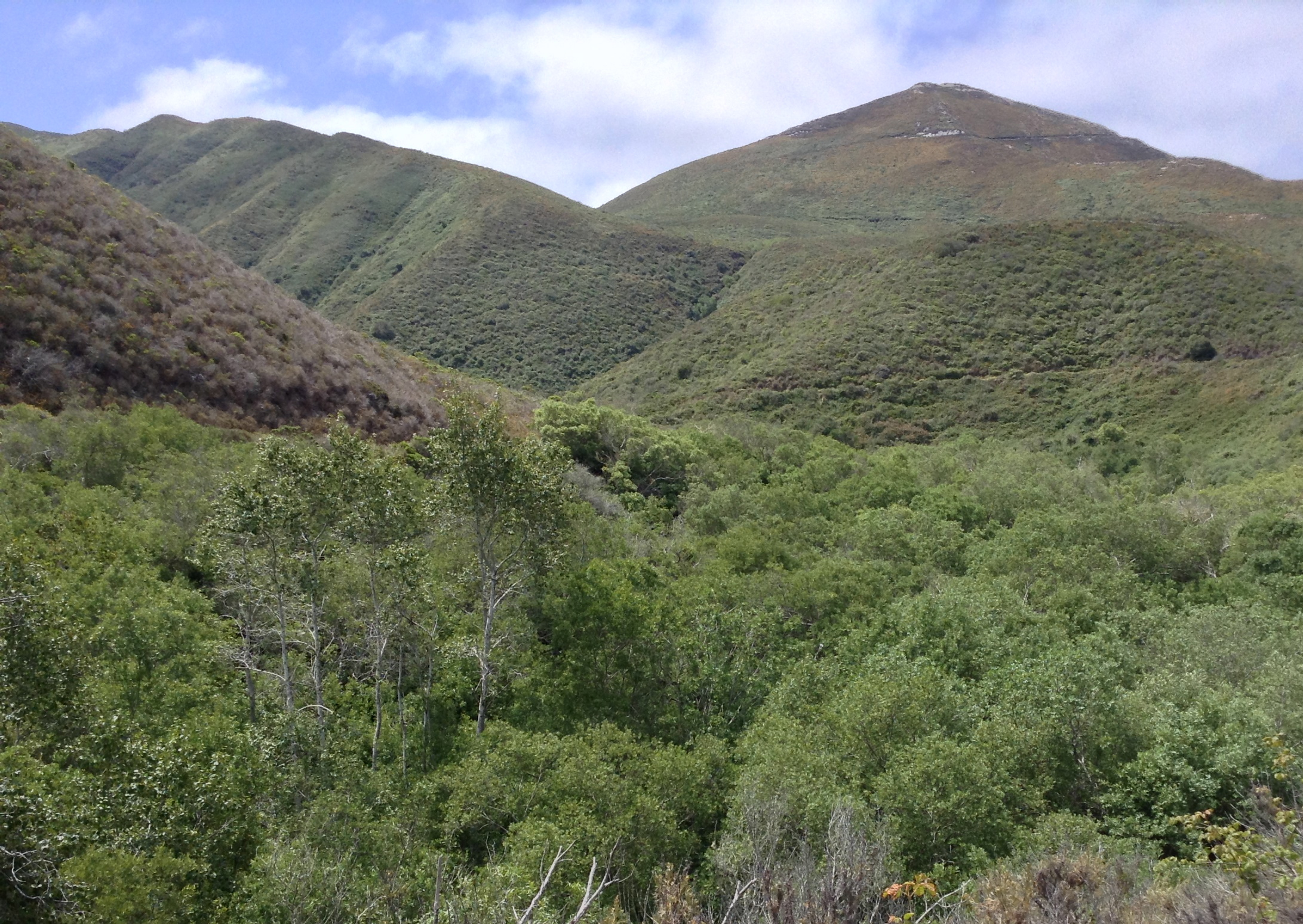
Montaña de Oro

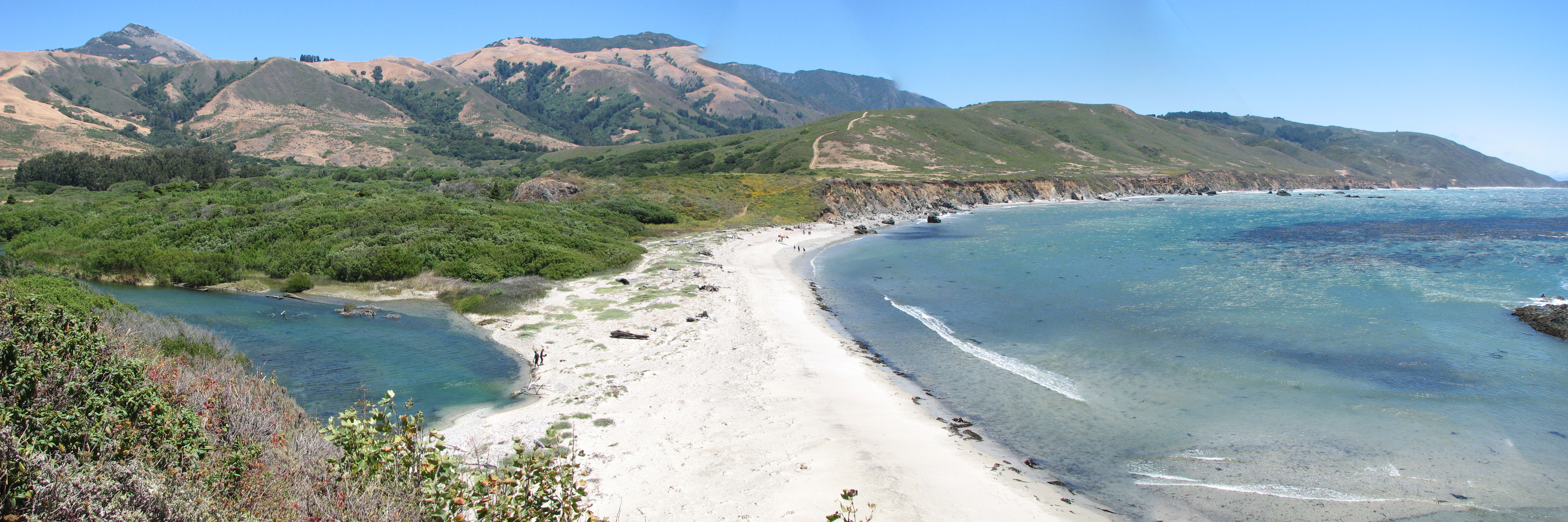
Andrew Molera

=== State Recreation Area ===
State Recreation Areas consist of "areas selected and developed to provide multiple recreational opportunities," and are selected for "having terrain capable of withstanding extensive human impact and for their proximity to large population centers, major routes of travel, or proven recreational resources." Underwater Recreation Areas consist of "areas in the nonmarine aquatic environment selected and developed to provide surface and subsurface water-oriented recreational opportunities..."

State Recreation Areas in California

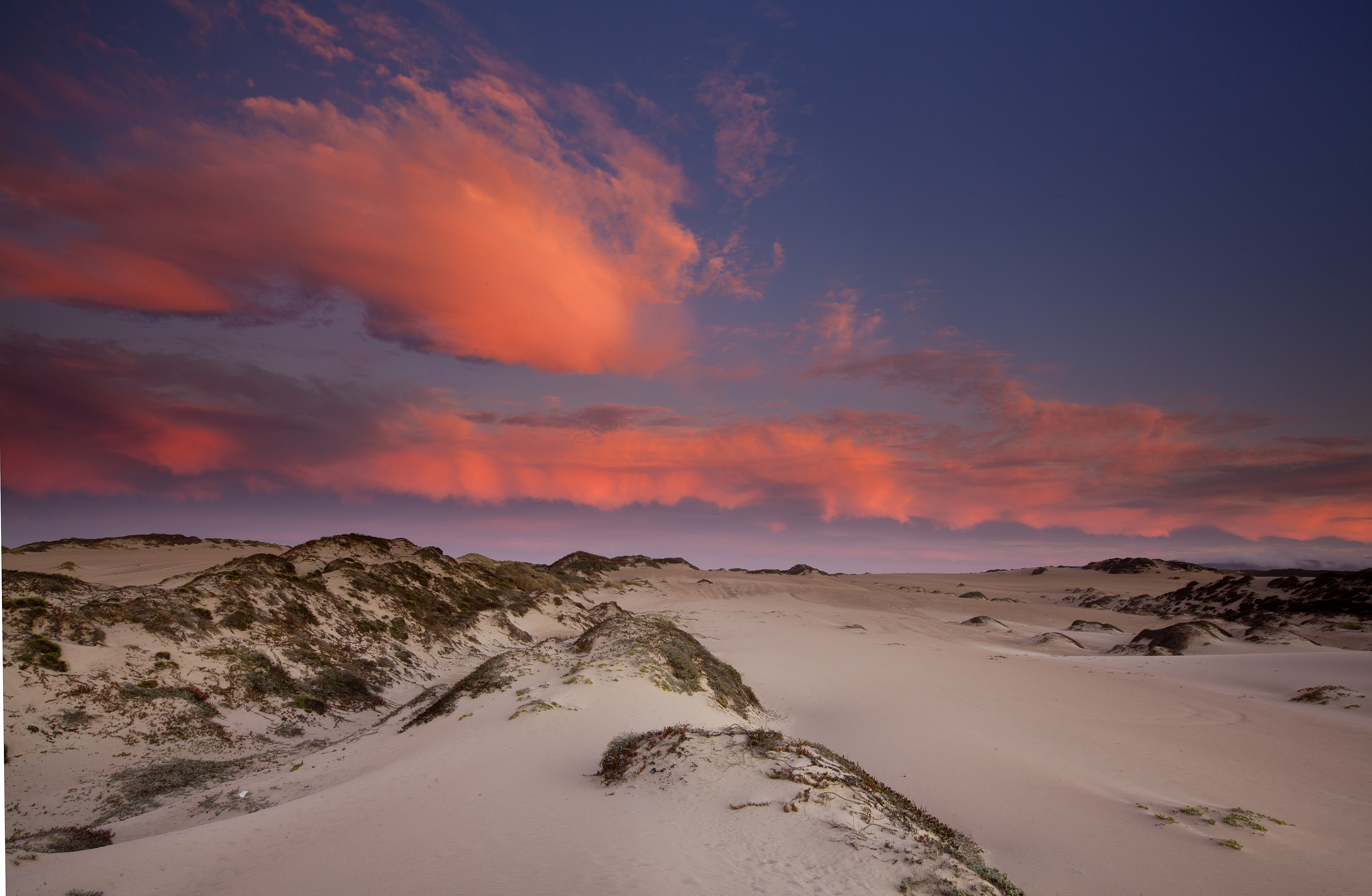
Oceano Dunes

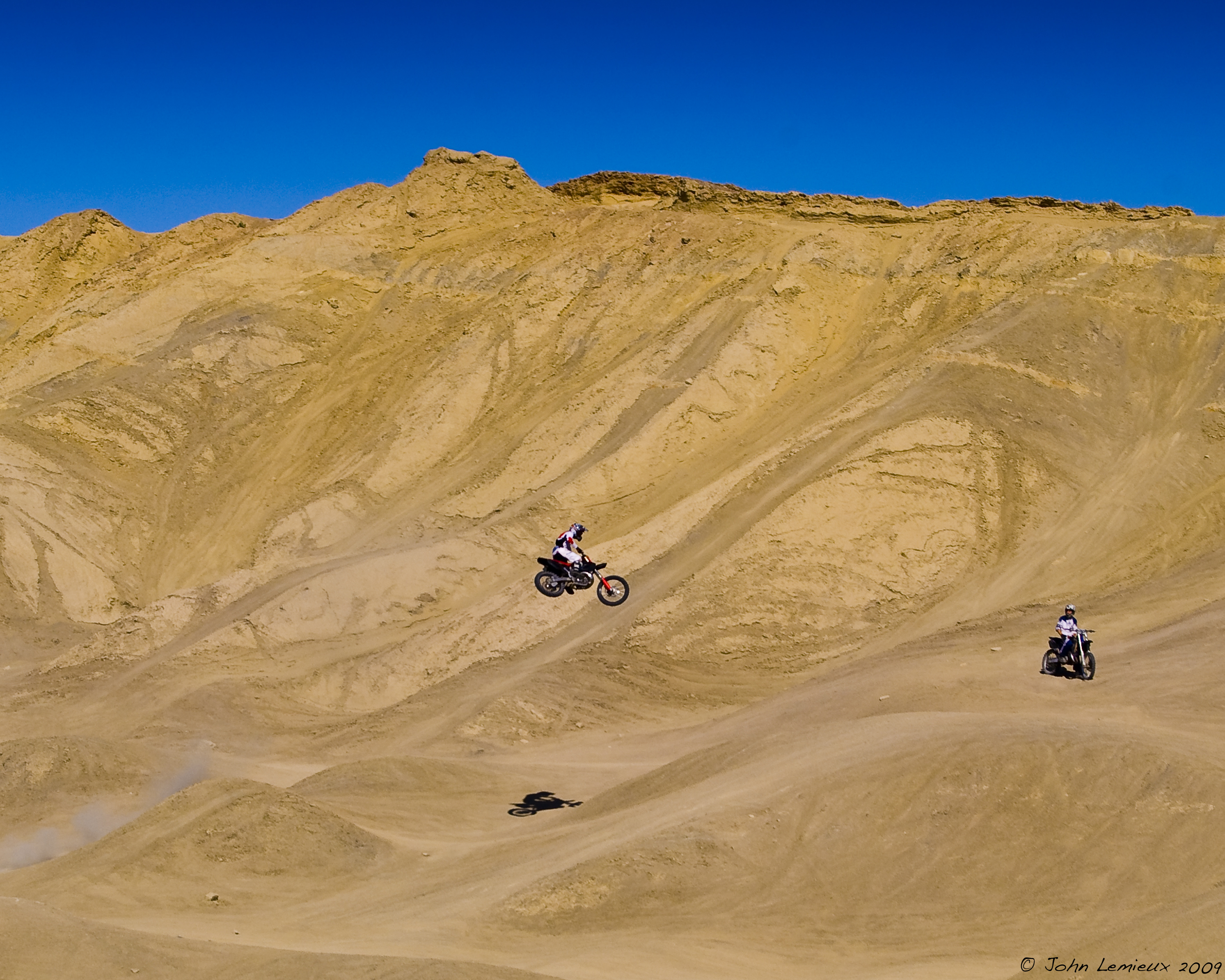
Ocotillo Wells

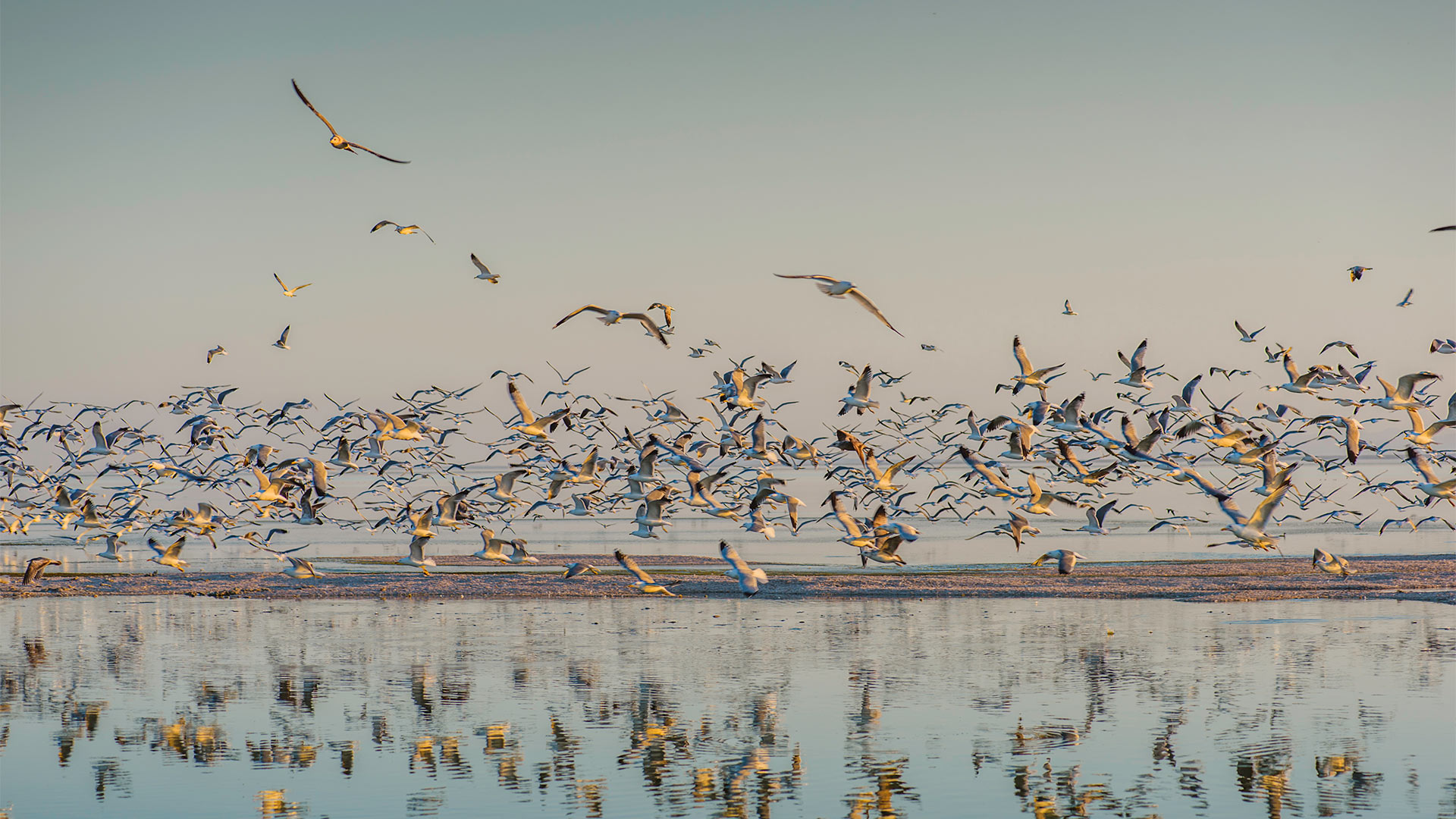
Salton Sea

=== State Beach ===
State Beaches consist of "areas with frontage on the ocean or bays designed to provide beach-oriented recreational activities." Wayside Campgrounds consist of "relatively small areas suitable for overnight camping and offering convenient access to major highways." Historical units are "nonmarine areas established primarily to preserve objects of historical, archaeological, and scientific interest, and archaeological sites and places commemorating important persons or historic events." State seashores "consist of relatively spacious coastline areas with frontage on the ocean, or on bays open to the ocean [...] possessing outstanding scenic or natural character and significant recreational, historical, archaeological, or geological values."

State Beaches in California

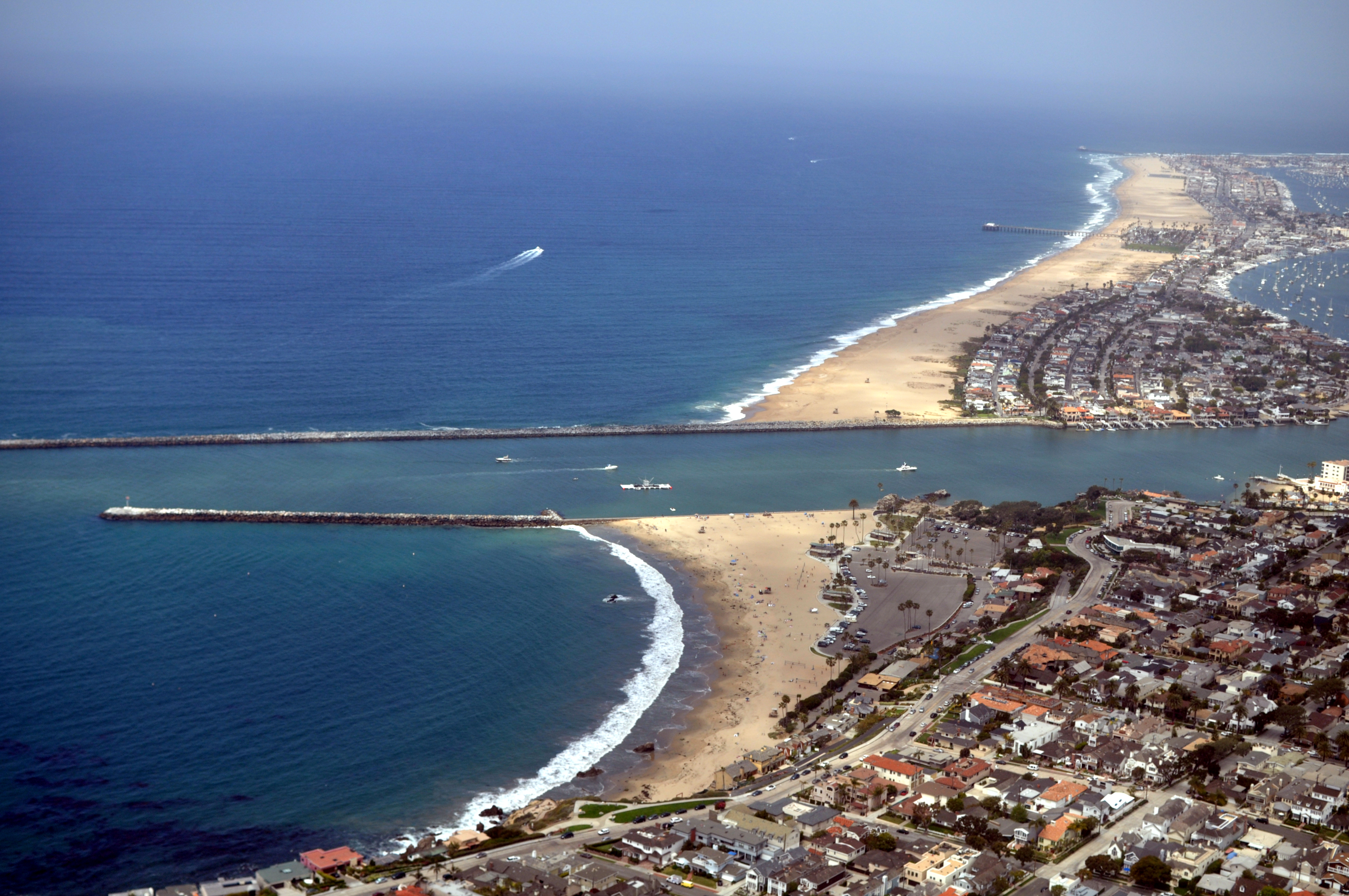
Corona del Mar

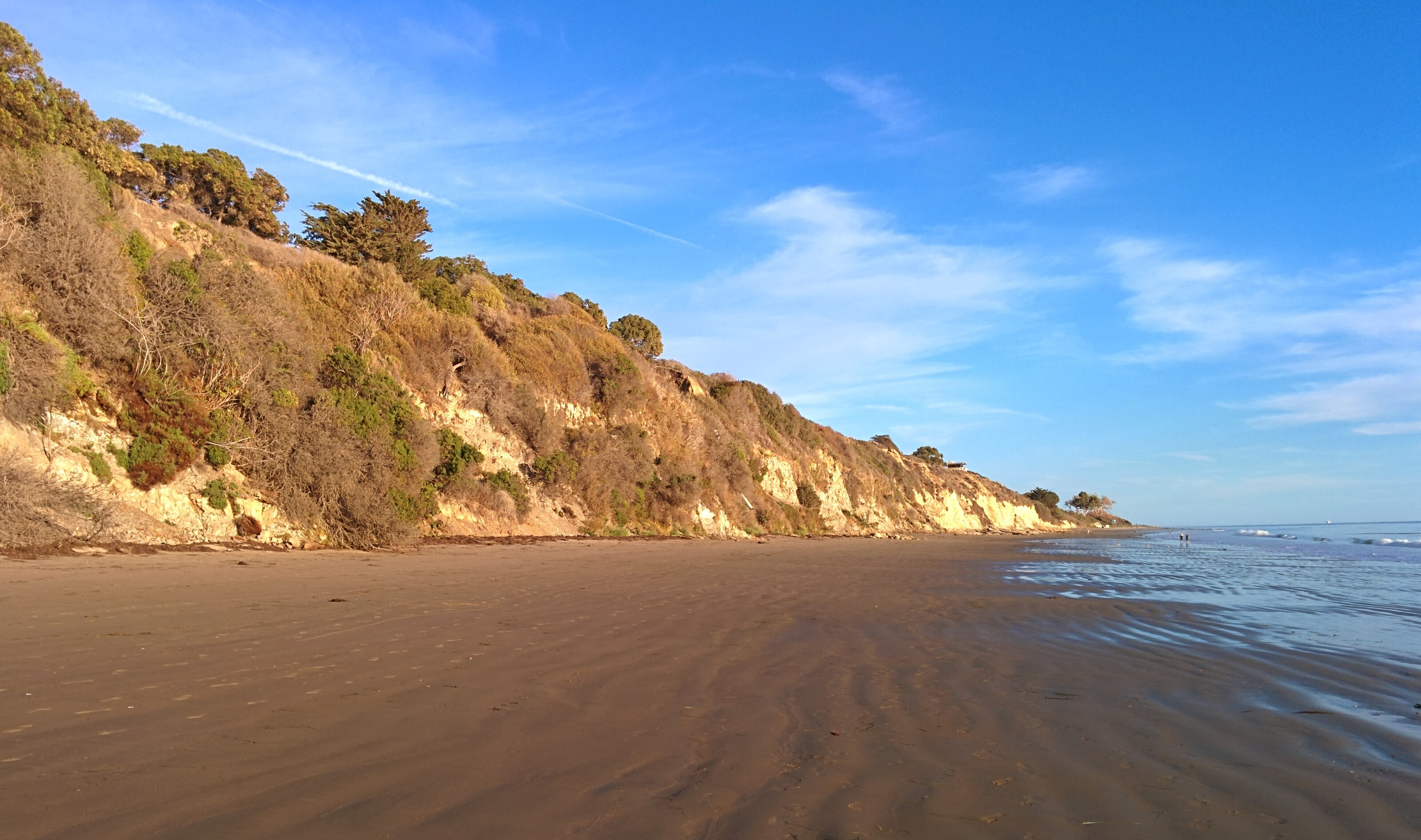
El Capitán

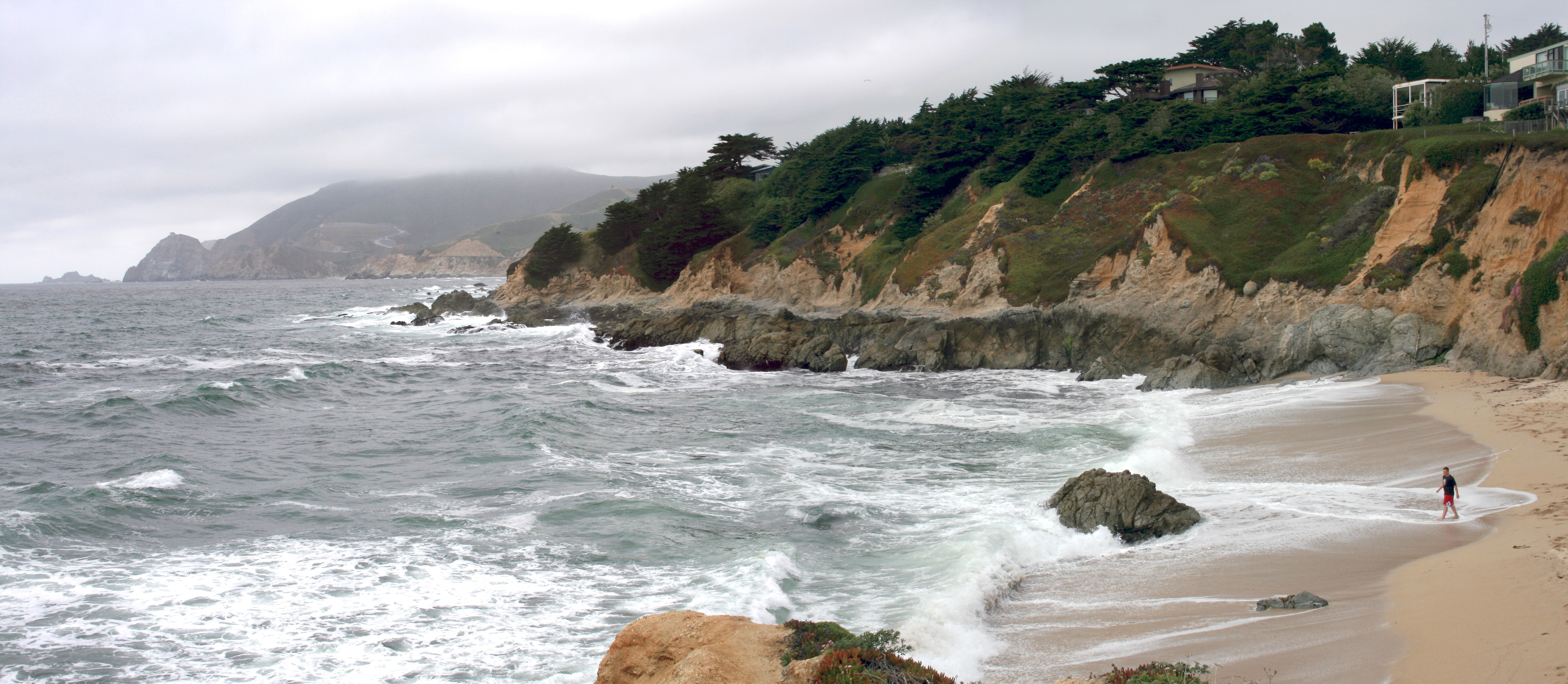
Montara

=== State Historic Parks ===
State Historic Parks consists of 51 specially designated historic sites across California, that highlight crucial events in the history of California and provide an educational opportunity for those interested in learning about Californian history, namely students. These include battlegrounds, Californian missions, historic estates, cave paintings, and colonial fortifications, among others.

State Historic Parks in California

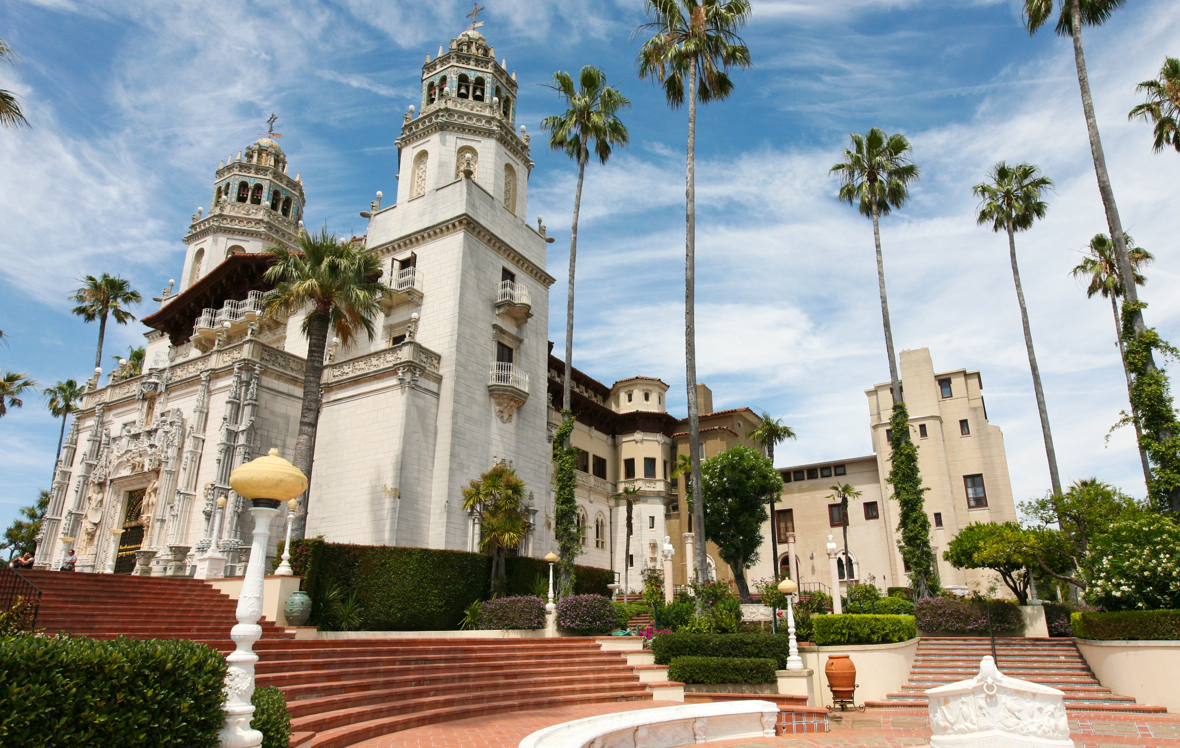
Hearst Castle

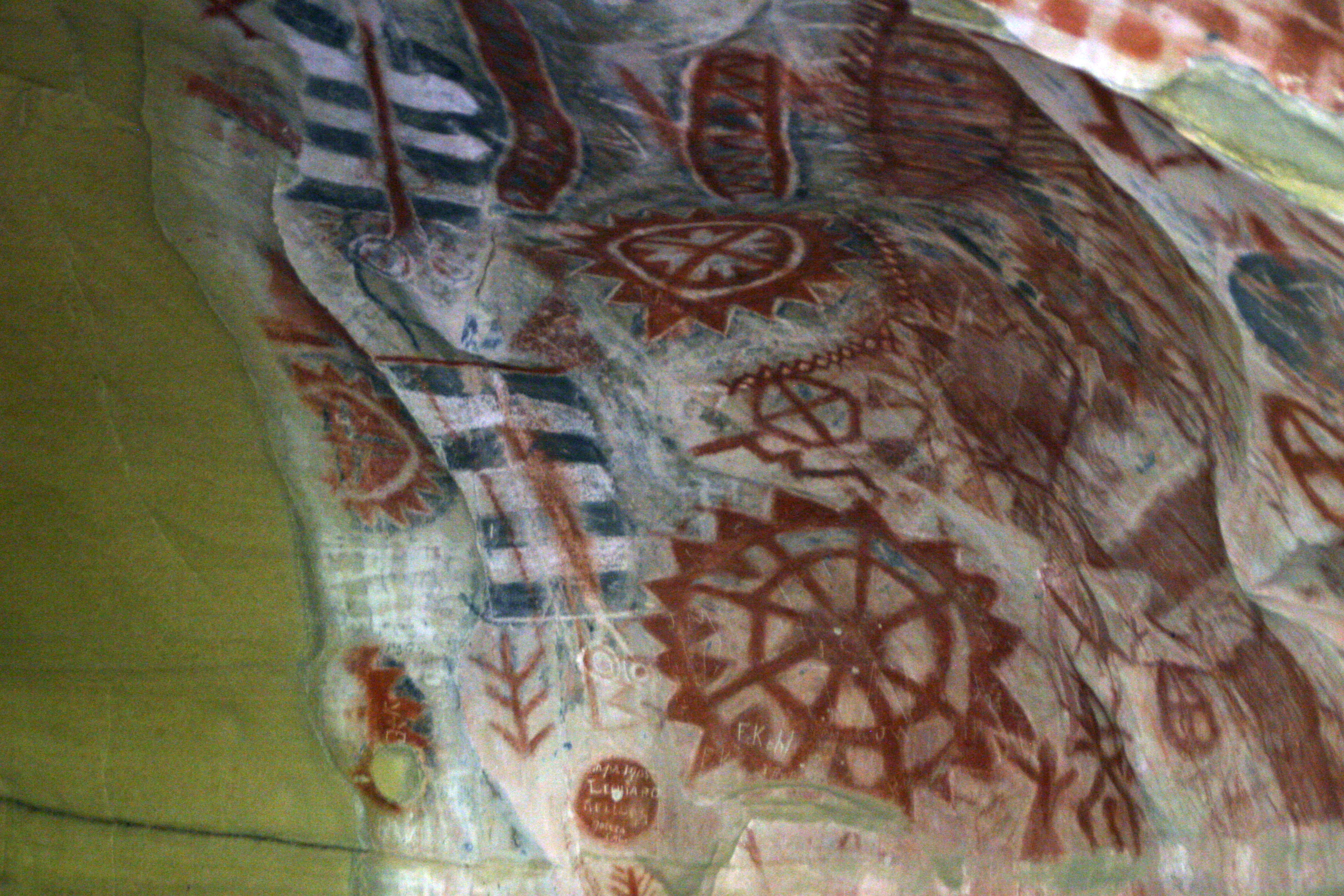
Chumash Painted Cave

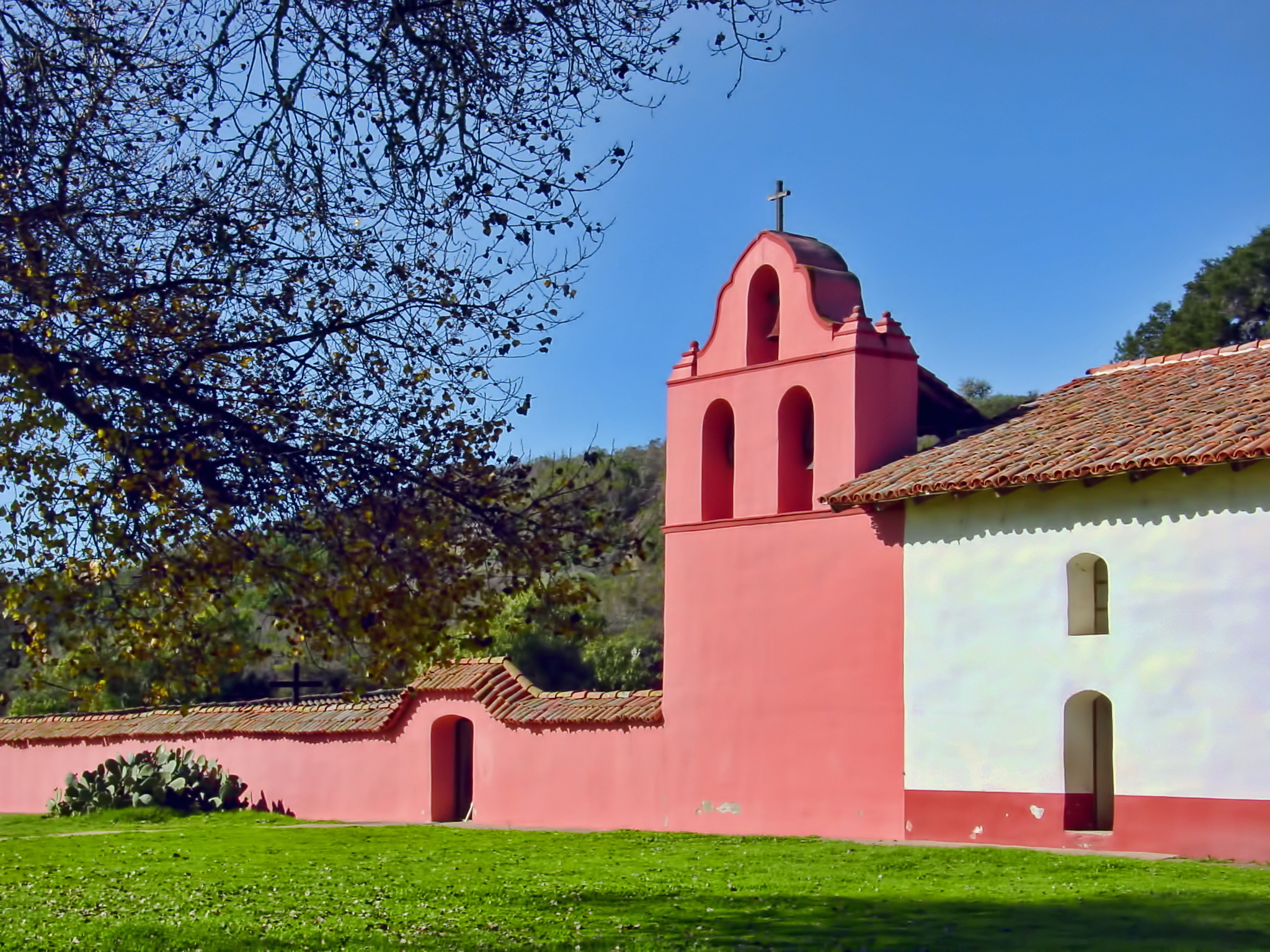
La Purísima Mission

=== State Reserve ===
State Reserves "consist of areas embracing outstanding natural or scenic characteristics or areas containing outstanding cultural resources of statewide significance," and are classified as either State Natural Reserves which consist of areas selected and managed to preserve their ecology, fauna, flora, geological features, and scenic qualities "in a condition of undisturbed integrity," or State Cultural Reserves which consist of areas selected and managed to preserve the integrity of historic structures and features as well as areas with spiritual significance to California indigenous people.

State Reserves in California

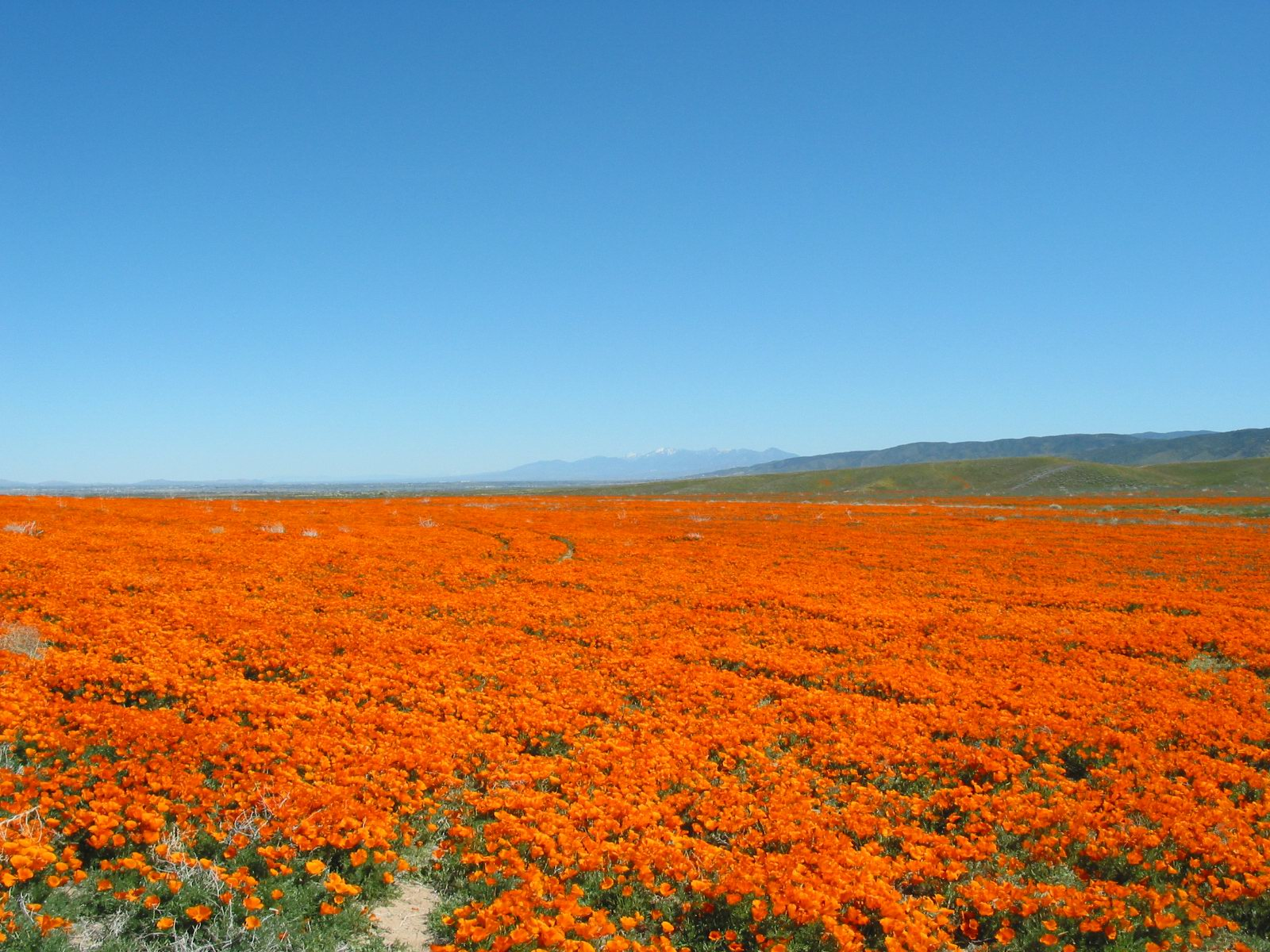
Antelope Valley

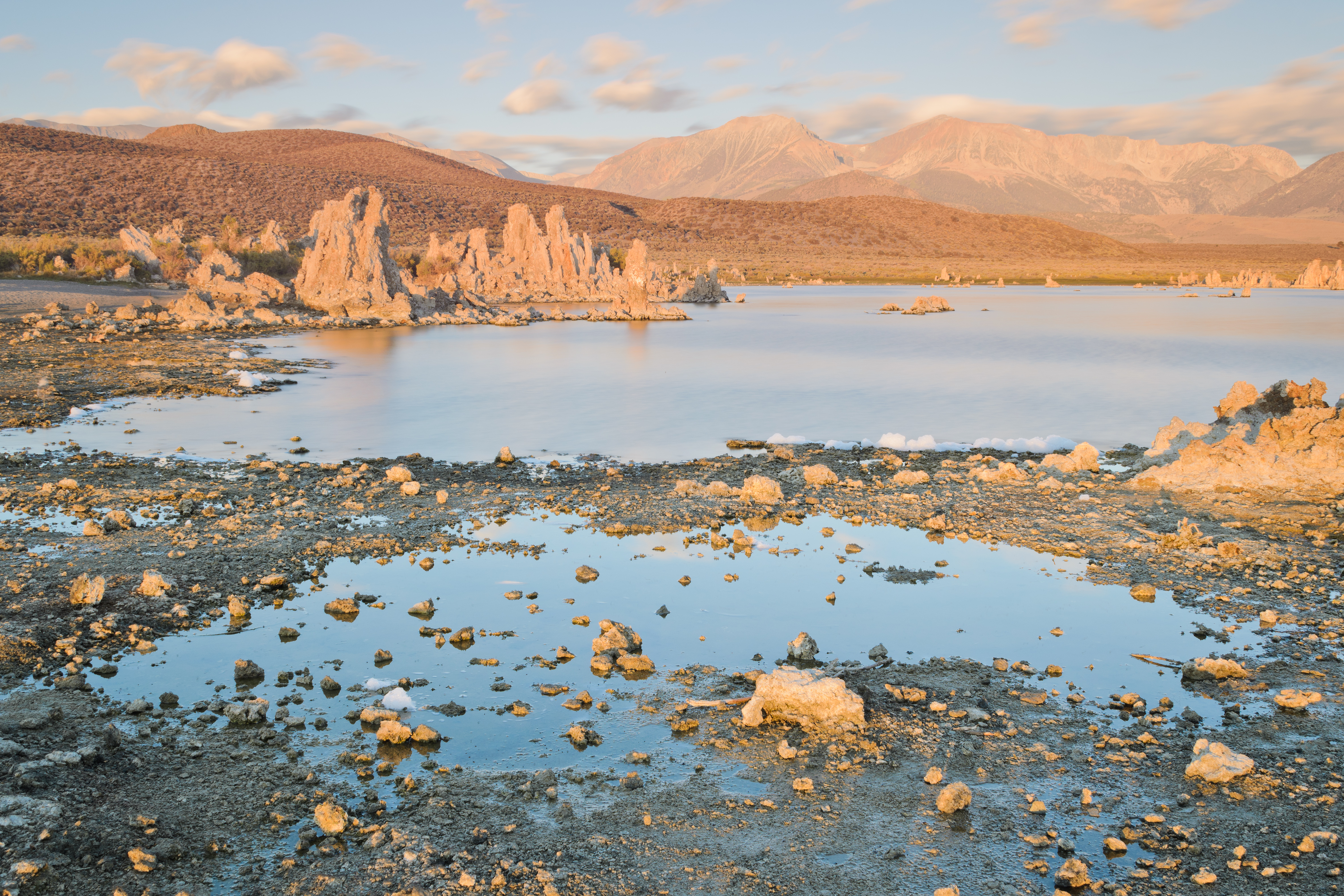
Mono Lake Tufa

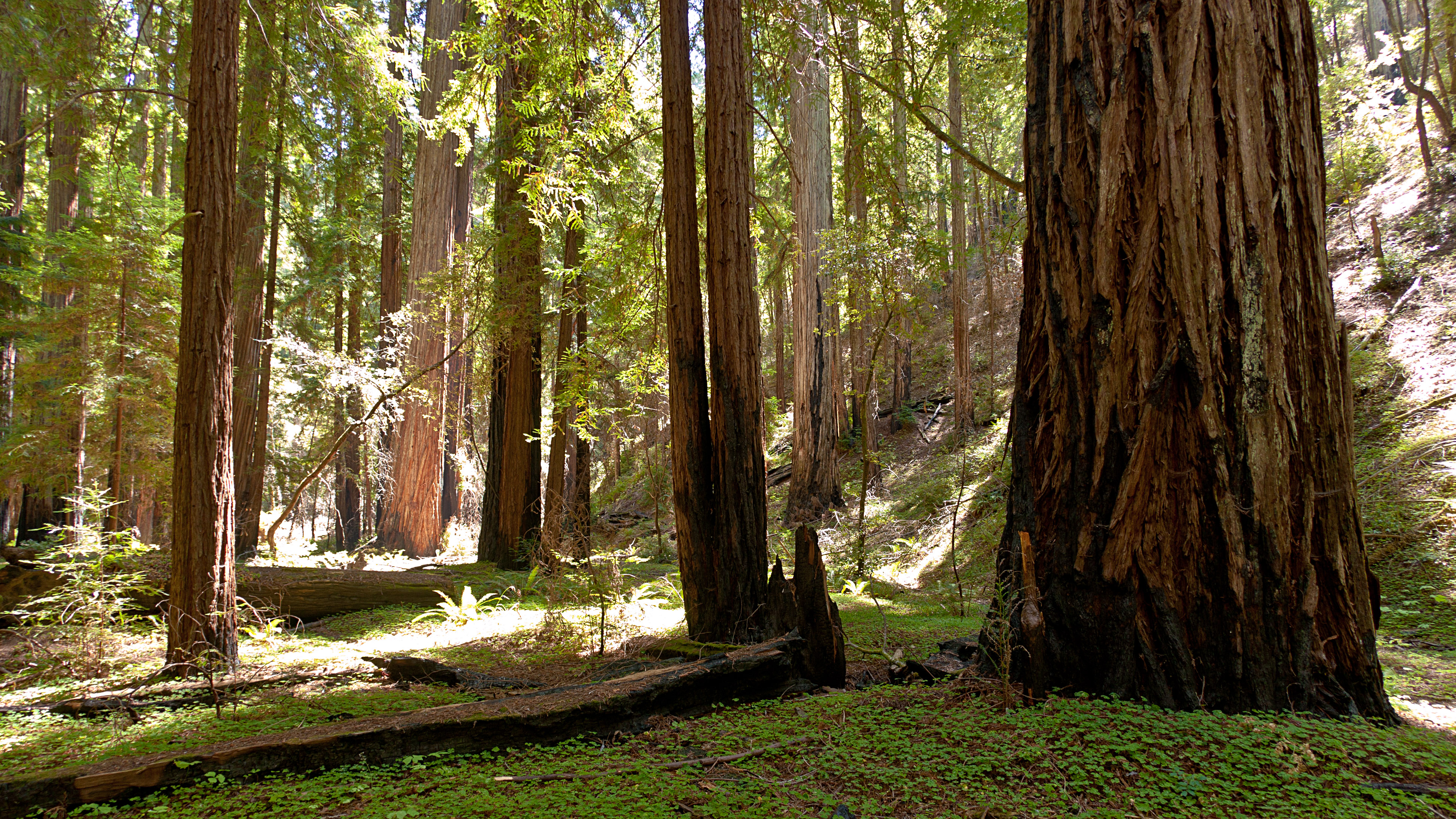
Montgomery Woods

=== State Wilderness ===
State Wildernesses are areas where the environment has not been affected by humans and are relatively undeveloped state-owned or leased lands which have retained their original characters and influence or have been restored to a near-natural appearance. State wildernesses can be established within other state parks system units. Natural preserves are nonmarine areas of outstanding natural or scientific significance established within the boundaries of other units to preserve features natural features such as rare or endangered species and their supporting ecosystems. Cultural preserves are those established also within other units to preserve cultural features such as sites, buildings or zones important to the human history of California.

State Wilderness in California

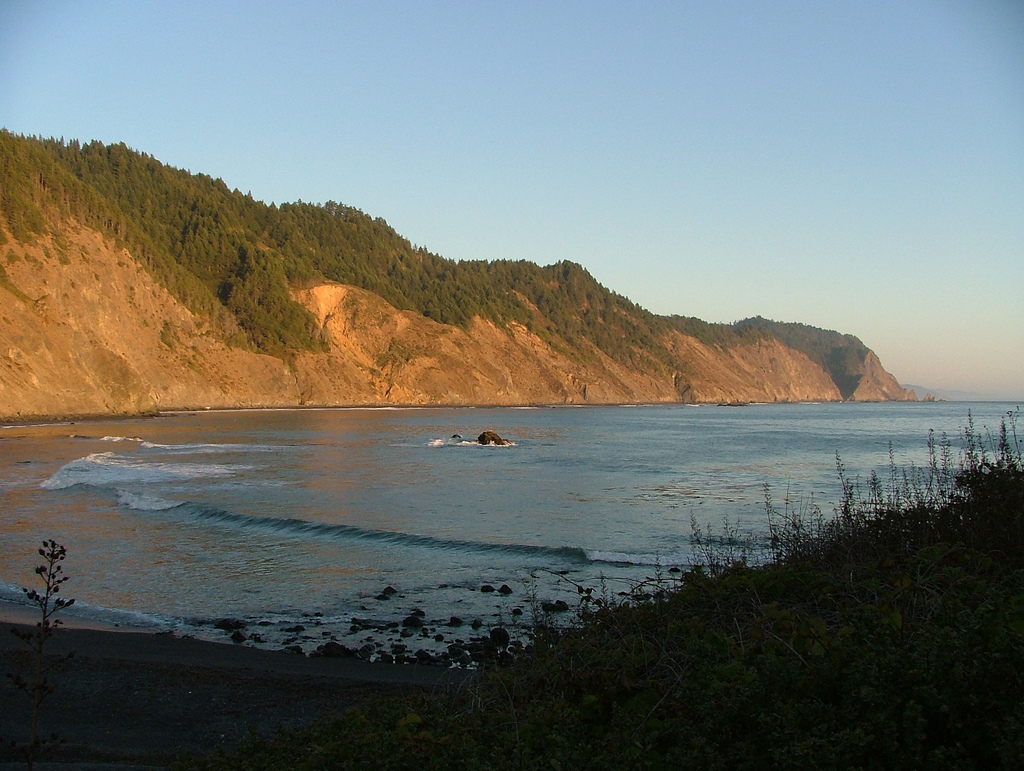
Sinkyone

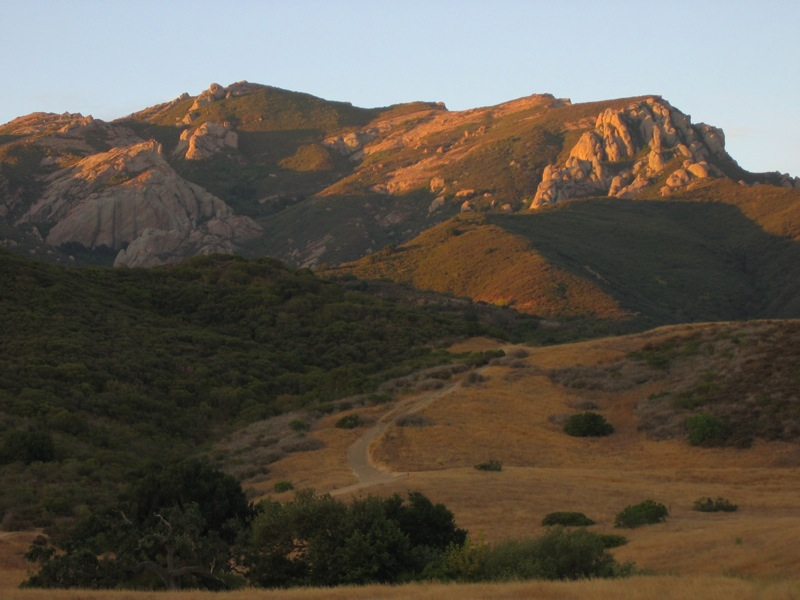
Boney Mountains

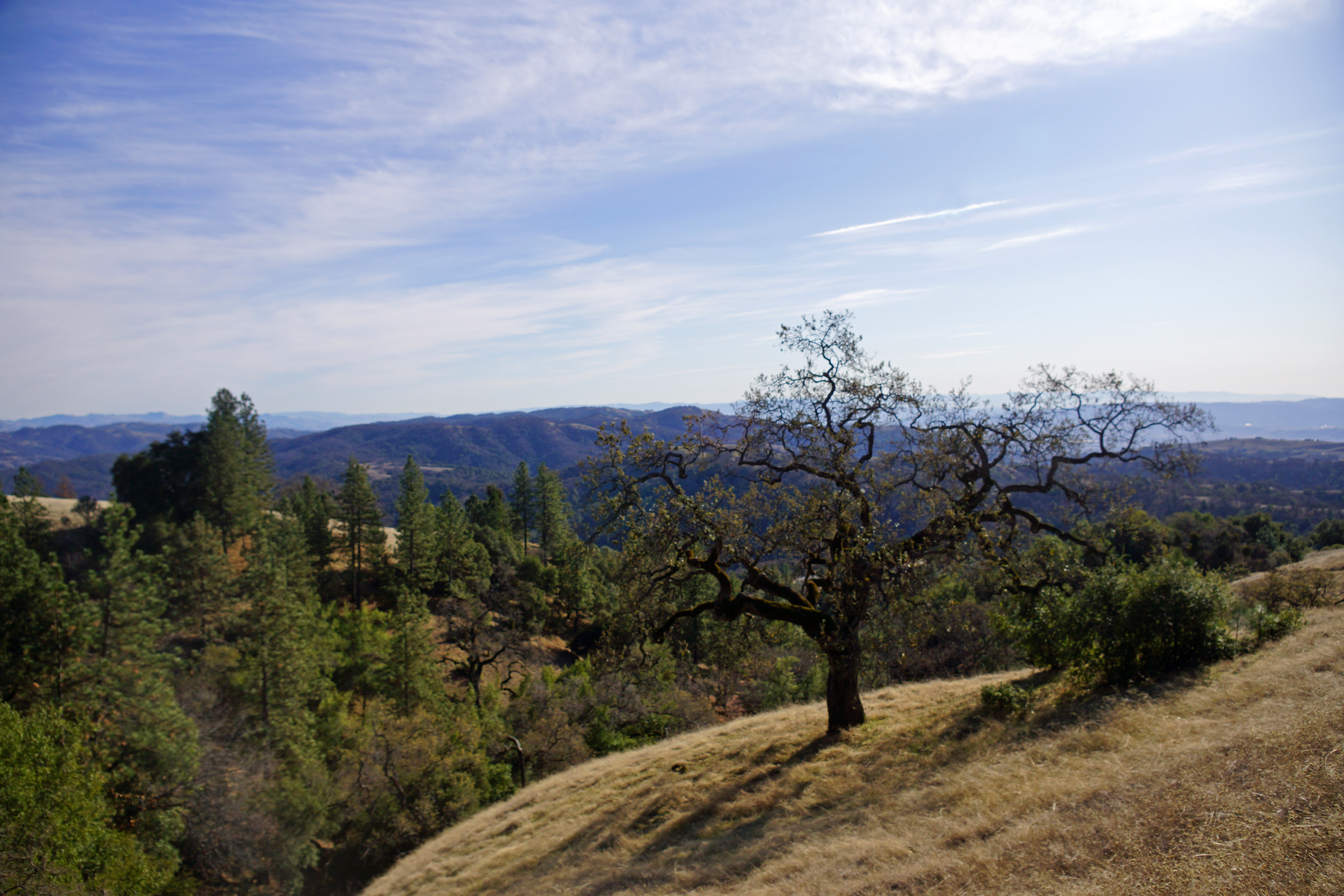
Orestimba

=== State Marine Reserve ===
State Marine Reserves have a uniform classifications established by the Marine Managed Areas Improvement Act: State Marine Reserve, State Marine Park, State Marine Conservation Area, State Marine Cultural Preservation Area, and State Marine Recreational Management Area.

State Marine Reserves in California

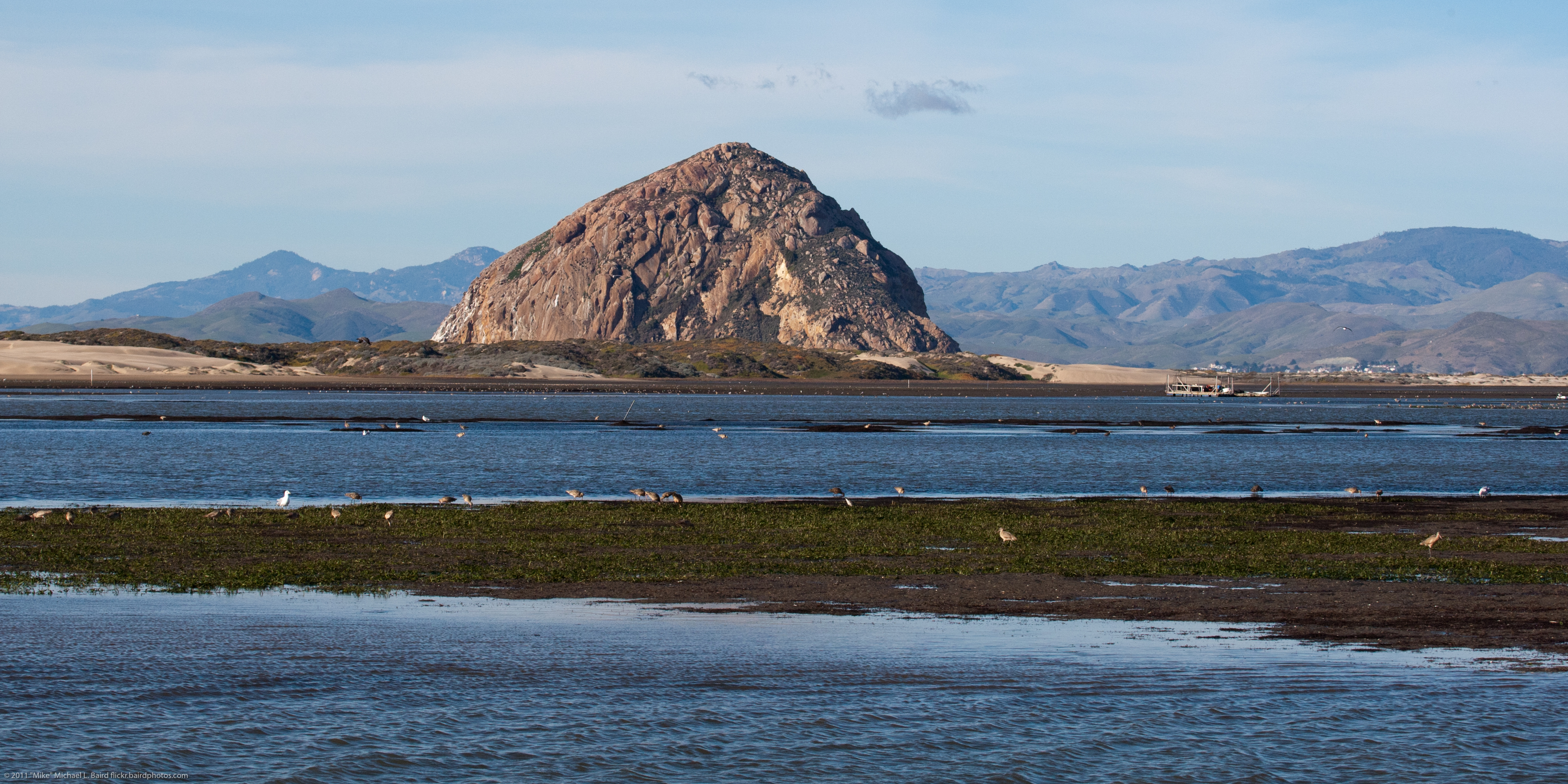
Morro Bay

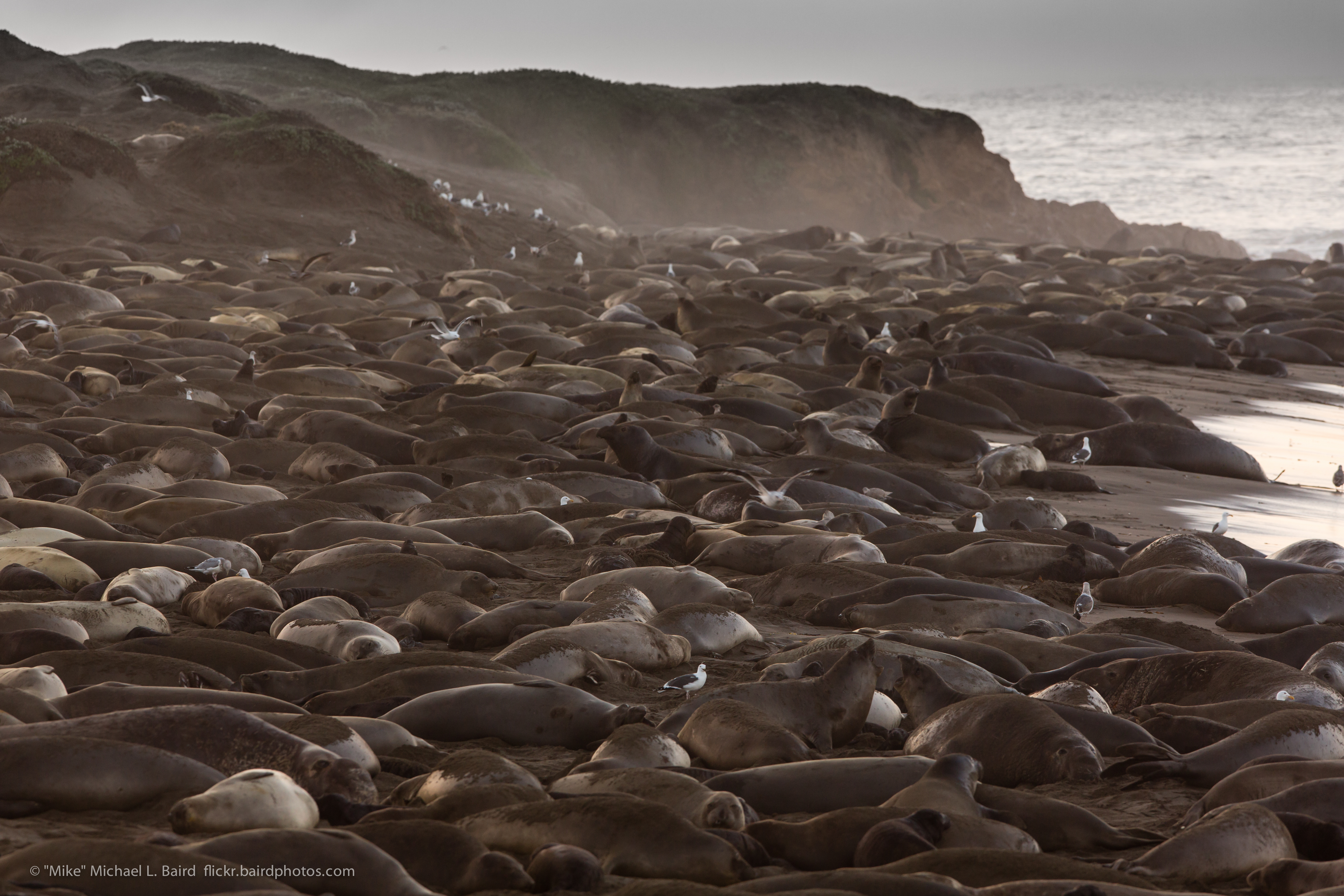
Piedras Blancas

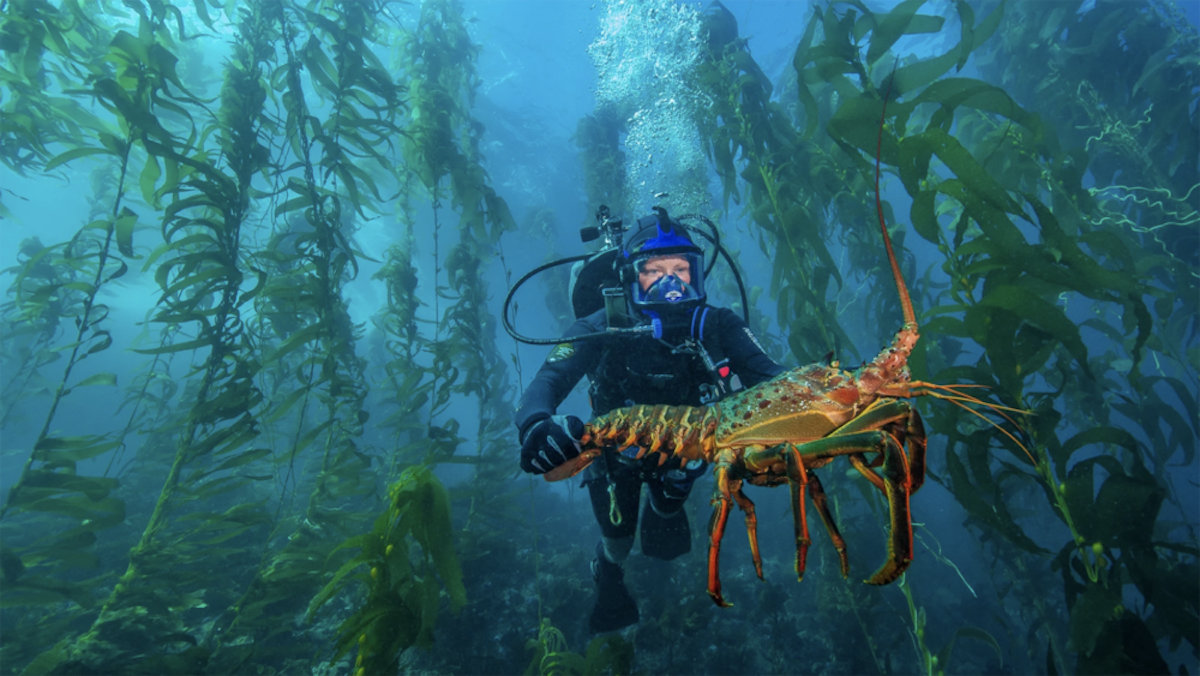
Anacapa

== See also ==
- List of California state parks
- Protected areas of California
- Redwoods Rising
