= Wildlife of the Channel Islands of California =

Flora and fauna of the Channel Islands of California

The wildlife of the Channel Islands of California is wide and diverse, including many endemic species. While the land wildlife is slightly limited, there being only one large, naturally predatory, and native mammal, the small island fox, marine life can include anything from kelp forests to great white sharks.

== Flora ==
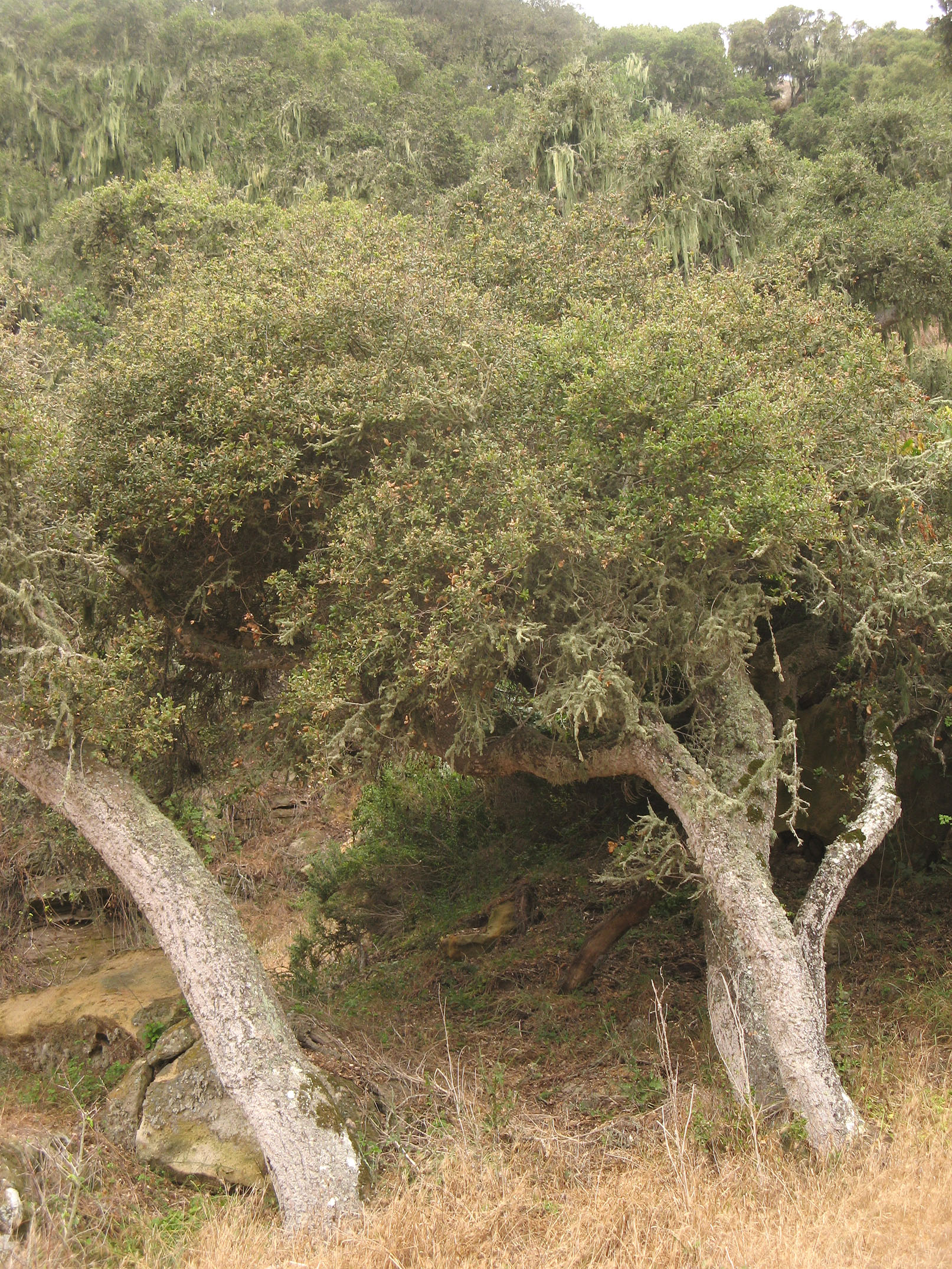
An island oak on Santa Rosa Island.

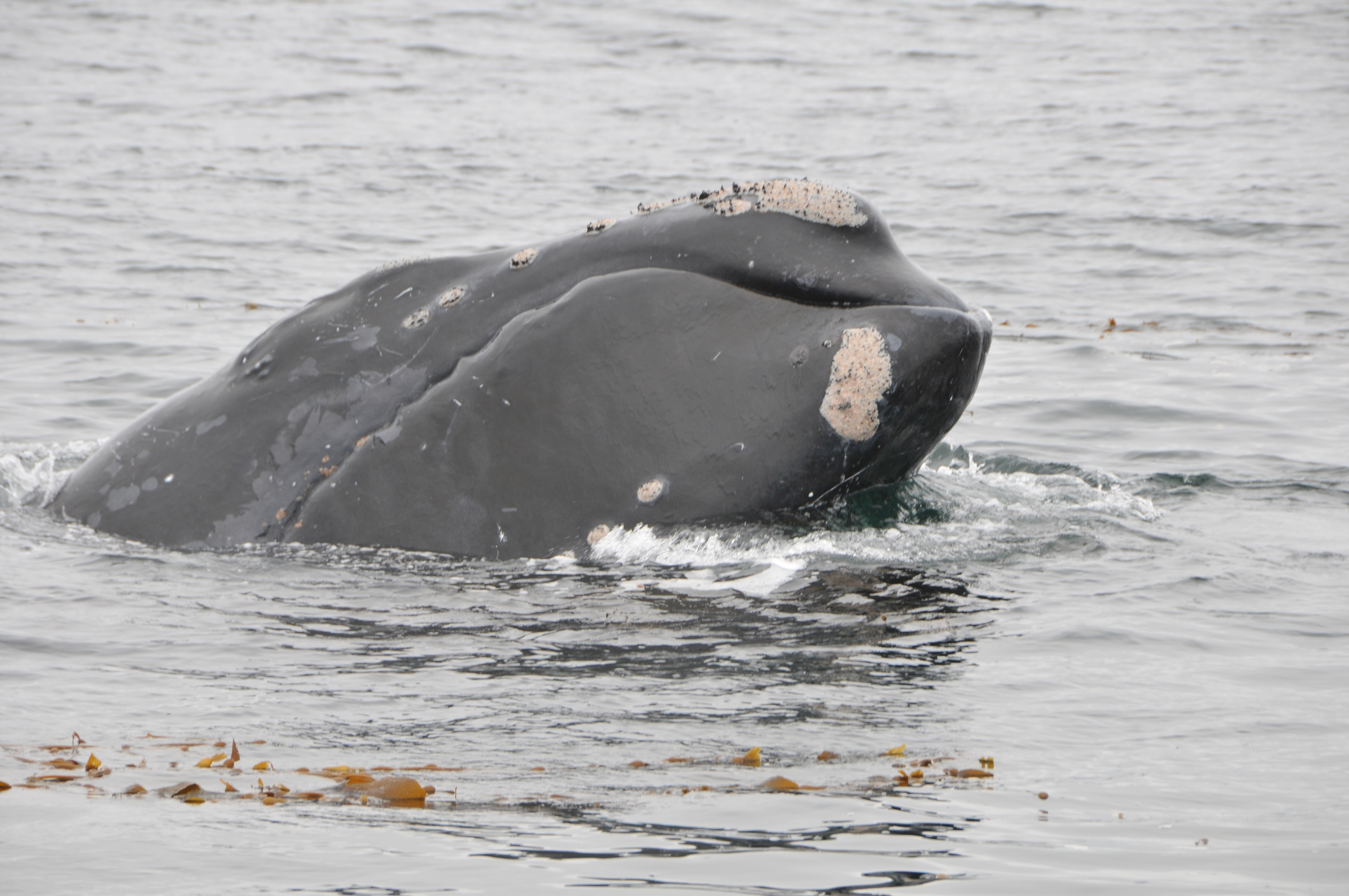
A North Pacific right whale off Anacapa Island

Flora on the Channel Islands include endemic subspecies of pine, oak, and the island tree mallow. Santa Rosa Island holds two groves of the Torrey pine subspecies Pinus torreyana var. insularis, which is endemic to the island. Torrey pines are the United States' rarest pine species. The islands also house many rare and endangered plants, including the island barberry, the island rushrose, and the Santa Cruz Island lace pod. Giant kelp forests surround the islands and act as a source of nutrition and protection for other animals.

Invasive species, such as the Australian blue gum tree, olive tree, sweet fennel and Harding grass threaten native species through competition for light, nutrients, and water. The Australian blue gum, for example, releases toxins in its leaf litter which prevent other species of plants from growing in the soil surrounding it. The blue gum, as well as other species including the Harding grass, are much more flammable and better adapted to wildfires than native species.

Kelp forests and many species of seaweed, sea urchin, and other marine plants live on the ocean floor.

- Catalina cherry (Prunus ilicifolia ssp. lyonii)
- Catalina ironwood (Lyonothamnus floribundus)
- Green liveforever (Dudleya hassei)
- Giant coreopsis (Coreopsis gigantea)
- Island oak (Quercus tomentella)
- Island tree mallow (Lavatera assurgentiflora)
- Island ceanothus (Ceanothus arboreus)
- Island bush-poppy (Dendromecon rigida ssp. harfordii)
- Island alumroot (Heuchera maxima)
- Santa Barbara Island buckwheat (Eriogonum giganteum var. compactum)
- Island barberry (Berberis pinnata ssp. insularis)
- San Clemente Island bushmallow (Malacothamnus clementinus)
- Santa Cruz Island bush mallow (Malacothamnus fasciculatus var. nesioticus)
- Santa Cruz Island ironwood (very like the Catalina ironwood, Lyonothamnus)
- Santa Cruz Island silver lotus
- Torrey pine (Pinus torreyana) [rare subspecies sole occurrence]
- Santa Catalina Island currant (Ribes viburnifolium)

== Fauna ==
An island fox prowls near a campsite.

In the waters of the Channel Islands, sea lions are very common. Sharks like great whites, bulls, tigers and makos roam the seas. Orcas also appear near the Channel Islands. A colony of mostly western gulls lived on Anacapa Island.

The Channel Islands and surrounding waters hold many endemic species and subspecies of animals, including fauna such as the Channel Islands deer mouse, the Channel Islands spotted skunk, island scrub jay, San Clemente loggerhead shrike, and San Clemente Bell's sparrow. Many species of large marine mammals, including Pacific gray whales, blue whales, humpback whales, and California sea lions breed or feed close to the Channel Islands. It is unknown if critically endangered North Pacific right whales, and historically abundant Steller's sea lions are present. Seabirds, including western gulls, bald eagles, pigeon guillemots, and Scripps's murrelets use the islands as well for shelter and breeding grounds. The endemic island fox is California's smallest natural canine and has rebounded from its near extinction in the late 1990s. Several endemic reptile species, including the island fence lizard and island night lizard, live on the islands, as well as the endemic amphibian the Channel Islands slender salamander .

Non-native species can include feral cows, sheep, and pigs.

- Island fox (Urocyon littoralis)
- Channel Island spotted skunk (Spilogale gracilis amphiala)
- Island scrub jay (Aphelocoma insularis)
- Ashy storm-petrel (Oceanodroma homochroa)
- Island fence lizard (Sceloporus occidentalis becki)
- Island night lizard (Xantusia riversiana)
- Deer mouse
- Channel Islands slender salamander (Batrachoseps pacificus)
- Santa Cruz sheep
- San Clemente Island goat
- Catalina Island buffalo herd
- San Clemente Bewick's wren (Thryomane bewickii leucophrys), extinct 1927
- Pygmy mammoth (Mammuthus exilis), prehistoric
- Giant deer mouse (Peromyscus nesodytes), prehistoric

== Food chain ==
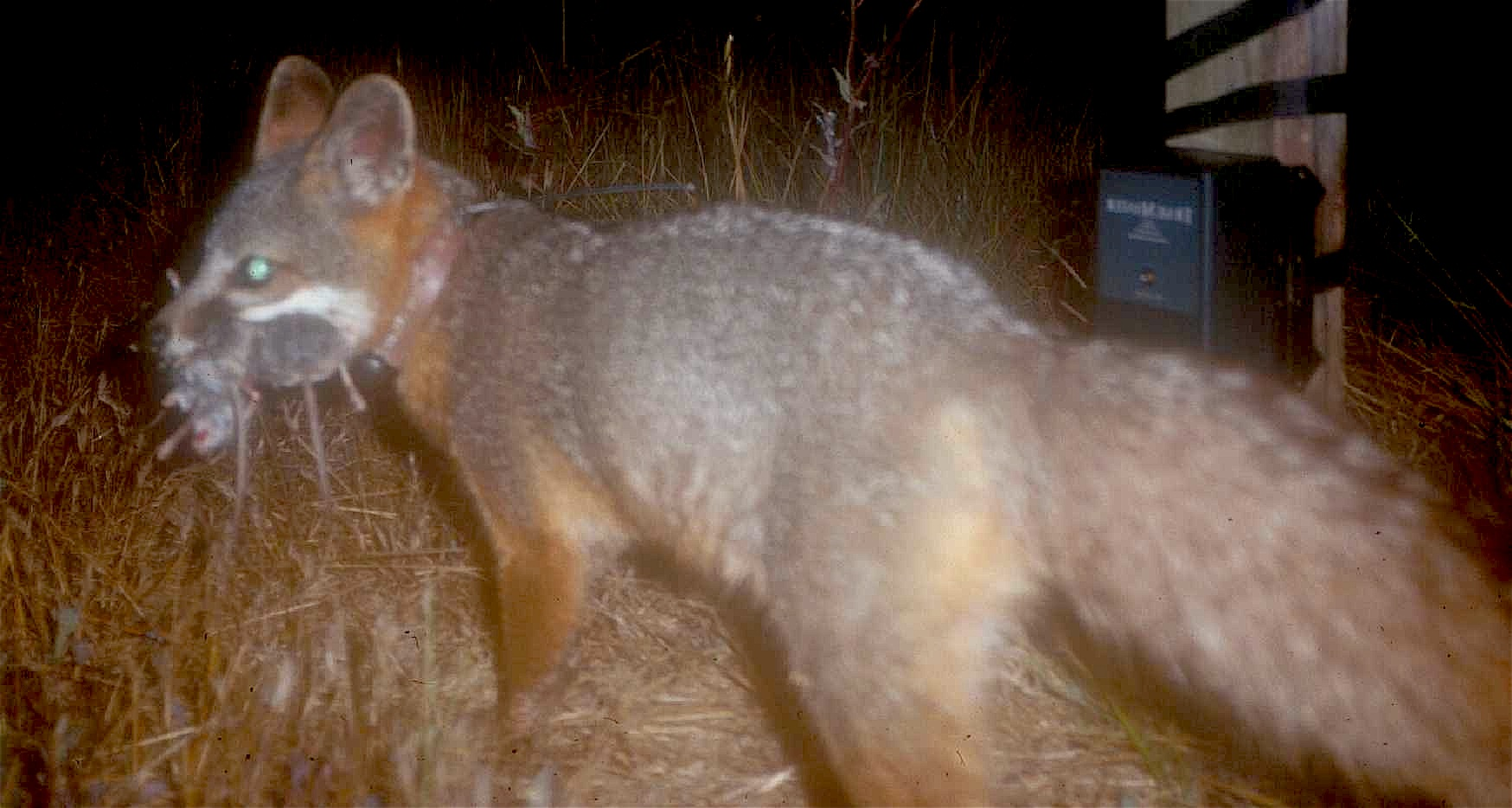
A night time shot of an island fox with three mice in its jaws.

The lowest on the food chain are the plants. Deer mice and small vermin, like the spotted skunk, follow, along with insects, lizards, and small birds, mammals and fish.

The predatory animals include sharks, orcas (an apex predator), eagles, and foxes.

The island fox eats fruits, insects, birds, eggs, crabs, lizards, and small mammals, including deer mice.

== Land mammals ==
=== Native ===
There are only three native land mammals on the archipelago: The island deer mouse, the island spotted skunk, and the island fox.

==== Deer mouse ====
The deer mouse exists on all five islands. It can survive in conditions with a significant lack of fresh water, for example, Santa Barbara and Anacapa islands, the two Channel Islands without rivers.

==== Spotted skunk ====
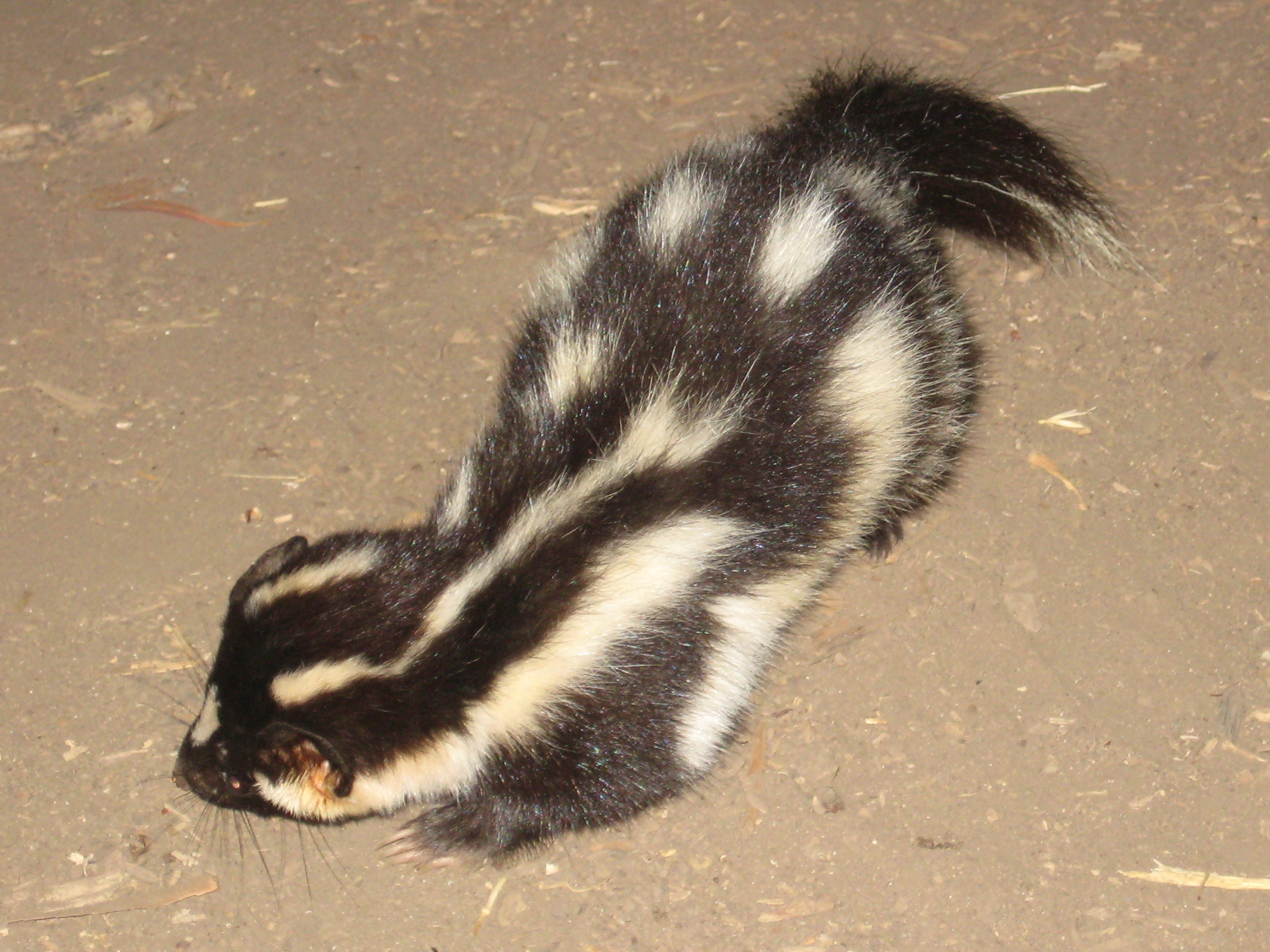
An island spotted skunk

The spotted skunk is only confirmed to exist on Santa Cruz Island and Santa Rosa Island. It used to be confirmed to exist on a third island, San Miguel Island, but is now presumed, but not confirmed, extirpated from there. Santa Cruz Island houses some skunks, however, Santa Rosa Island is home to over three thousand.

==== Island fox ====
The island fox is the largest native land mammal, existing on three of the five Channel Islands: Santa Cruz, Santa Rosa, and San Miguel. It does not exist on the Santa Barbara and Anacapa islands due to the lack of fresh water.
