= Marine Protected Area Network =

Group of MPAs which operate synergistically

A Marine Protected Area Network or MPA network is a network of Marine Protected Areas or Marine Reserves.

A Marine Protected Area Network can be defined as "a collection of individual MPAs or reserves operating cooperatively and synergistically, at various spatial scales, and with a range of protection levels that are designed to meet objectives that a single reserve cannot achieve". Such a network can include several MPAs of different sizes, located in critical habitats, containing components of a particular habitat type or portions of different kinds of important habitats, and interconnected by the movement of animals and plant propagules.

A Marine Protected Area Network is usually established to improve fish catch, to conserve biodiversity, or for a combination of these two reasons. They are usually placed so that larvae can migrate from MPAs to other, more impacted areas. It provides a framework that unifies the central aims of conservation and fishery management, while also meeting other human needs such as maintenance of coastal water quality, shoreline protection, education, research and recreational opportunities.

MPA networks have been defined as "A group of MPAs that interact with one another ecologically and/or socially form a network".

These networks are intended to connect individuals and MPAs and promote education and cooperation among various administrations and user groups. "MPA networks are, from the perspective of resource users, intended to address both environmental and socio-economic needs, complementary ecological and social goals and designs need greater research and policy support".

Filipino communities connect with one another to share information about MPAs, creating a larger network through the social communities' support. Emerging or established MPA networks can be found in Australia, Belize, the Red Sea, Gulf of Aden and Mexico.

In Scotland, the Scottish Marine Protected Area Network covers approximately 22 % of Scotland's seas. It consists of 231 sites protected by a variety of different conservation designations, many of which are the same as those used on land, such as Special Protection Areas (SPA) and Sites of Special Scientific Interest (SSSI). In addition to the statutory MPAs, five further sites are recognised as forming part of the Scottish MPA network, being categorised as "other area based measures": such areas, although not specifically created for nature conservation purposes, are considered to contribute to the protection of marine biodiversity.

== See also ==
- Protected areas
- Commonwealth marine reserves
