= Partnership for Interdisciplinary Studies of Coastal Oceans =

Ecosystem research and monitoring program

The Partnership for Interdisciplinary Studies of Coastal Oceans (PISCO) is a long-term ecosystem research and monitoring program, studying marine communities along the west coast of North America.

Activities are conducted at the latitudinal scale of the California Current Large Marine Ecosystem along the west coast of North America, anchored around the dynamics of hard-bottom habitats such as kelp forests and rocky shores and the oceanography of the nearshore ocean. The program studies changes in the ocean environment through both environmental monitoring and experiments, examining the causes and consequences of ecosystem changes over spatial scales that are the most relevant to marine species and management, but largely unstudied elsewhere.

Core elements of the program include the following:

- Interdisciplinary ecosystem science
- Data archiving and sharing
- Outreach to public and decision‐making user groups
- Interdisciplinary training
- Coordination of a distributed research team

== History ==
The program was established in 1999 with funding from the David and Lucile Packard Foundation, and is led by scientists from Oregon State University; Stanford University's Hopkins Marine Station; University of California, Santa Cruz (UCSC); and University of California, Santa Barbara (UCSB). As of 2005, core PISCO activities were funded by collaborative grants from the David and Lucile Packard Foundation and the Gordon and Betty Moore Foundation.
