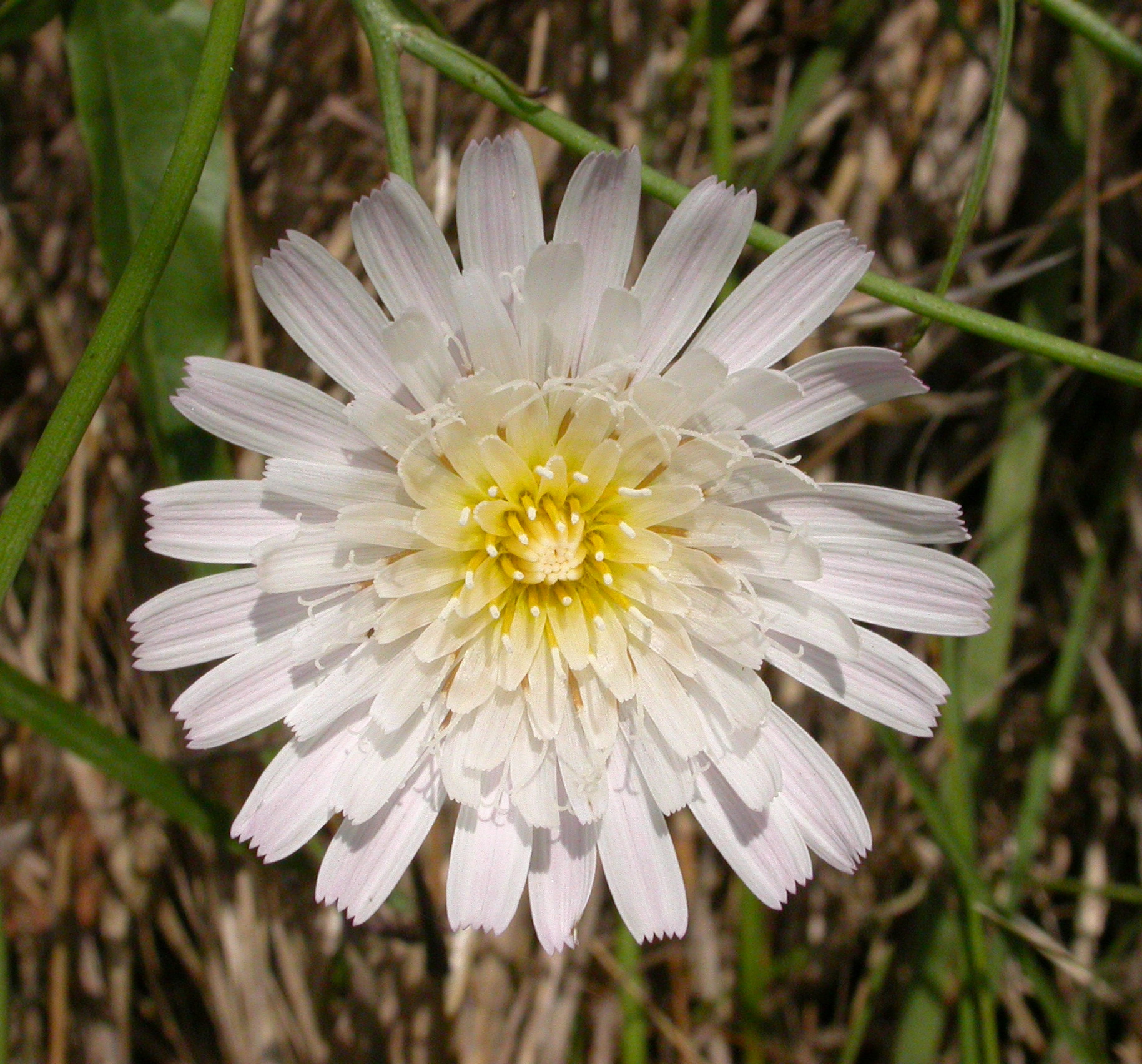
- Malacothrix saxatilis

Scientific classification
- Kingdom: Plantae
- Clade: Tracheophytes
- Clade: Angiosperms
- Clade: Eudicots
- Clade: Asterids
- Order: Asterales
- Family: Asteraceae
- Subfamily: Cichorioideae
- Tribe: Cichorieae
- Subtribe: Microseridinae
- Genus: Malacothrix; DC.

Synonyms
- Leucoseris Nutt.; Malacomeris Nutt.; Malacolepis A.Heller

= Malacothrix (plant) =

Genus of flowering plants

Malacothrix is a genus of plants in the tribe Cichorieae within the family Asteraceae. They are known generally as desert dandelions or desertdandelions. Most are native to western North America although a few have been introduced to South America. Several are found only on offshore islands in the Pacific.

Phylogenetic analysis demonstrates that Malacothrix is not monophyletic. Some of its species are related to Atrichoseris, whereas a second group is more closely related to Anisocoma and Calycoseris.

Species

1. Malacothrix californica - California desertdandelion - CA Baja California, Baja California Sur
2. Malacothrix clevelandii - Cleveland's desertdandelion - CA AZ UT Baja California
3. Malacothrix coulteri - snake's head - CA NV AZ UT NM Baja California
4. Malacothrix fendleri - Fendler's desertdandelion - AZ NM TX Sonora
5. Malacothrix floccifera - woolly desertdandelion - CA NV
6. Malacothrix foliosa - leafy desertdandelion - San Clemente Island
7. Malacothrix glabrata - smooth desertdandelion - CA NV AZ NM ID OR Baja California, Baja California Sur
8. Malacothrix incana - dunedelion - CA
9. Malacothrix indecora - Santa Cruz Island desert-dandelion - Santa Cruz Island
10. Malacothrix insularis - island desertdandelion - Coronados Island in Baja California
11. Malacothrix junakii - Junak's desertdandelion - Anacapa Island
12. Malacothrix phaeocarpa - Davis' desertdandelion - CA
13. Malacothrix saxatilis - cliff desertdandelion - CA
14. Malacothrix similis - twin desertdandelion - CA Baja California
15. Malacothrix sonchoides - sowthistle desertdandelion - OR ID WY CO NM AZ UT NV CA
16. Malacothrix sonorae - Sonoran desertdandelion - Sonora AZ NM TX
17. Malacothrix squalida - Santa Cruz desertdandelion - Santa Cruz Island
18. Malacothrix stebbinsii - Stebbins' desertdandelion - OR CA NV AZ NM UT Sonora
19. Malacothrix torreyi - Torrey's desertdandelion - CA NV AZ NM UT CO WY ID MT OR
20. Malacothrix xanthi - Baja California, Baja California Sur
