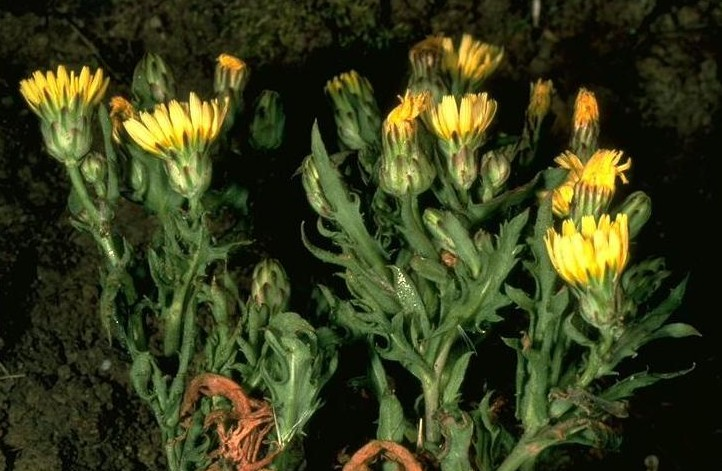

Conservation status
- Endangered (ESA)

Scientific classification
- Kingdom: Plantae
- Clade: Tracheophytes
- Clade: Angiosperms
- Clade: Eudicots
- Clade: Asterids
- Order: Asterales
- Family: Asteraceae
- Genus: Malacothrix
- Species: M. squalida

Binomial name
- Malacothrix squalida Greene

= Malacothrix squalida =

Species of flowering plant

Malacothrix squalida is a rare species of flowering plant in the family Asteraceae known by the common name Santa Cruz desertdandelion. It is endemic to Santa Cruz and Anacapa Islands, two of the eight Channel Islands of California, where it grows on rocky seaside bluffs and cliffs. The plant is very limited in distribution and today exists only in degraded habitat on these two small islands. It was last collected from Santa Cruz Island in 1968, and two populations were noted on Anacapa Island in 1998; in drought years there may be no plants at all. It became a federally listed endangered species in 1997. This is an annual herb growing a hairless, waxy stem 20 to 30 centimeters in maximum height. The leaves are sharply lobed. The inflorescence is an array of flower heads lined with oval-shaped phyllaries. The ray florets are 1 to 2 centimeters and light yellow in color.
