= Snake's head =

Snake's head is a common name for several plants and may refer to:

- Fritillaria meleagris, native to Europe
- Malacothrix coulteri, native to North America
