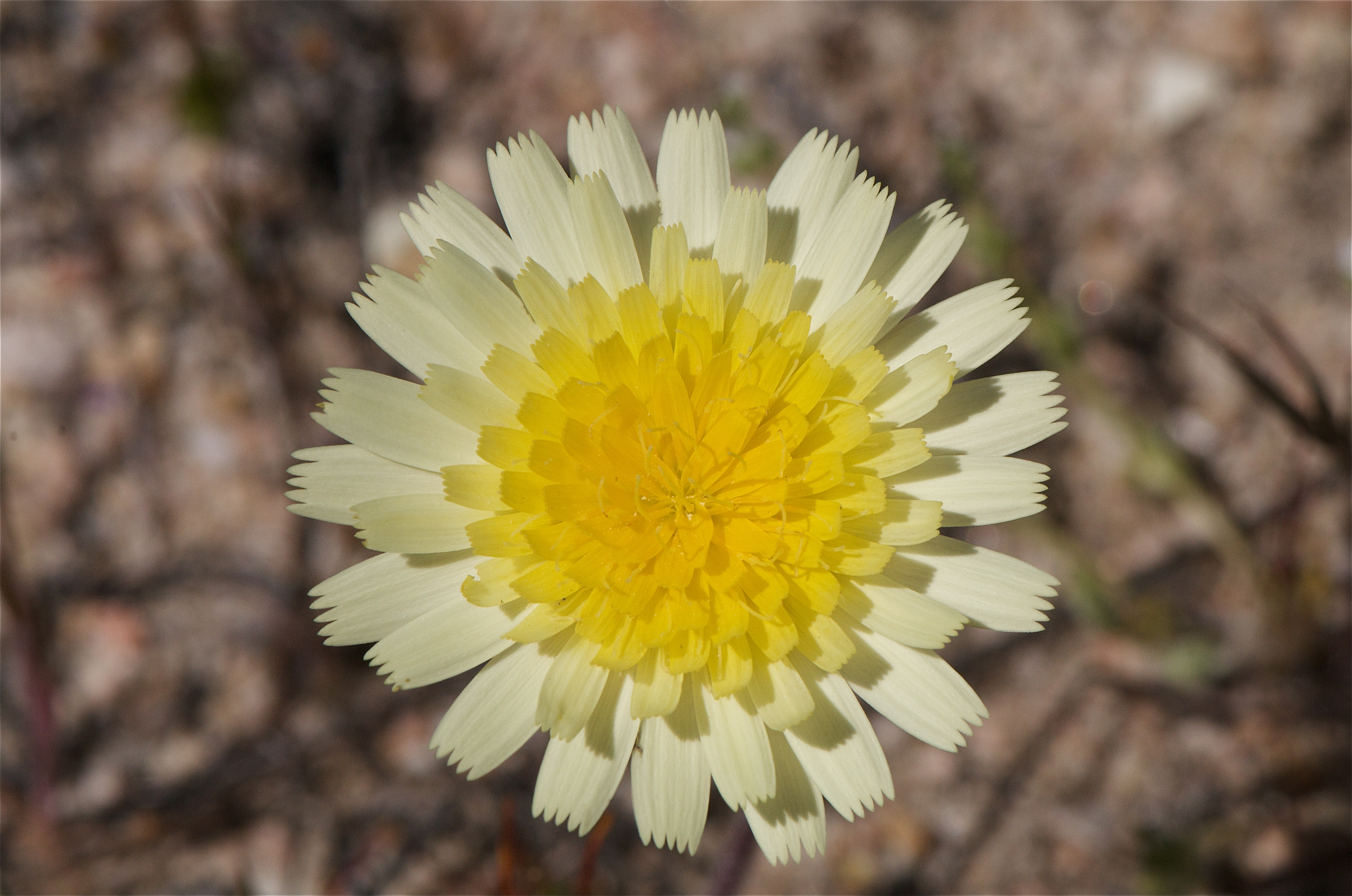

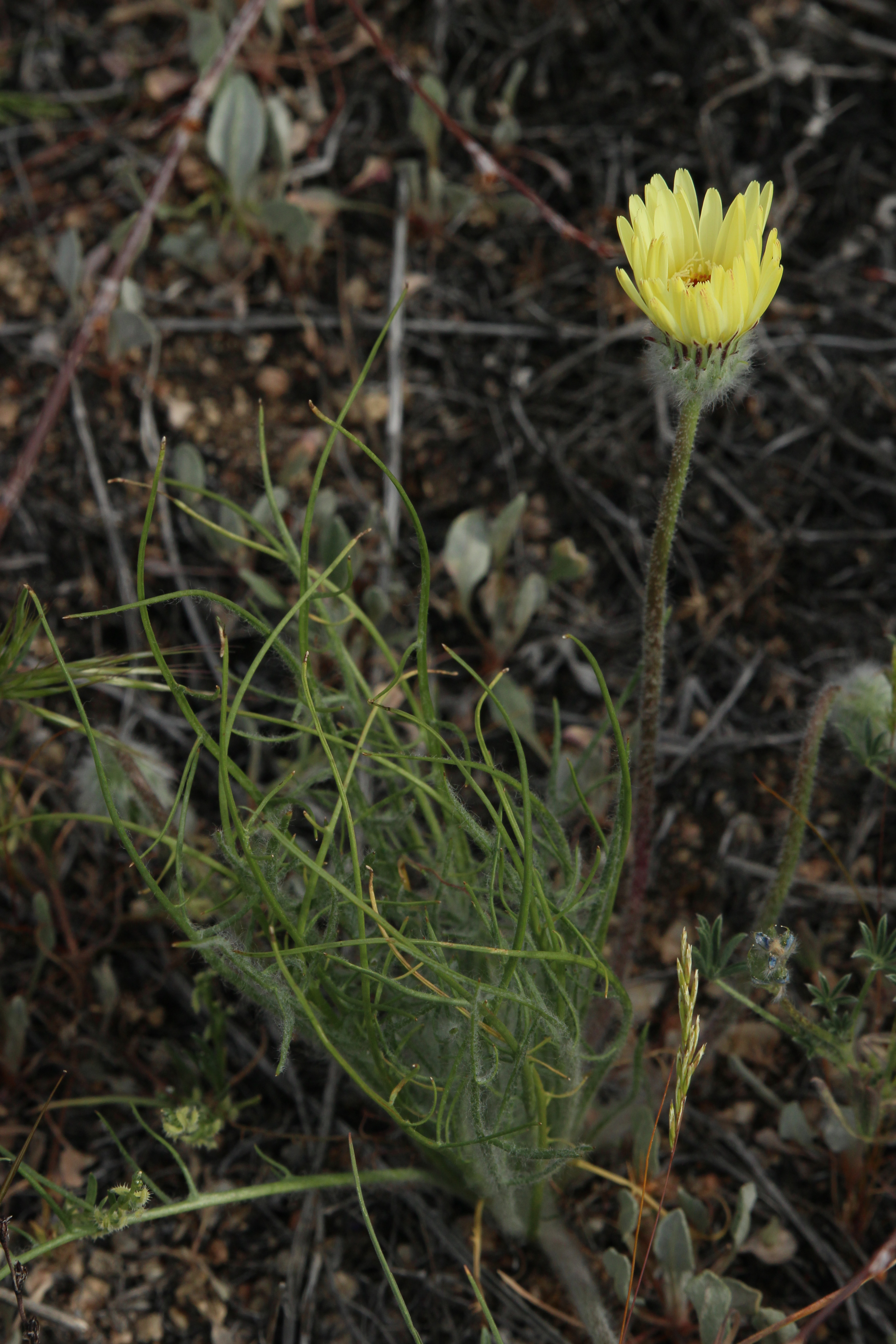

Scientific classification
- Kingdom: Plantae
- Clade: Tracheophytes
- Clade: Angiosperms
- Clade: Eudicots
- Clade: Asterids
- Order: Asterales
- Family: Asteraceae
- Genus: Malacothrix
- Species: M. californica

Binomial name
- Malacothrix californica DC.

= Malacothrix californica =

Species of flowering plant

Malacothrix californica is a species of flowering plant in the family Asteraceae known by the common name California desertdandelion. It is native to California, the western margin of Arizona and Baja California, where it may be found especially in the South Coast, Transverse and Peninsular Ranges and the western Mojave Desert.

Involucres (8–)10–15 × 5–6 mm. Phyllaries usually 20–26+ in 2-3+ series, (midstripes often reddish) lanceolate to lance-linear or subulate, unequal, hyaline margins 0.1–0.5 mm wide, abaxial faces (of outermost, at least) shaggily piloso-hirsute to arachnose (at least proximally).

== Description ==
It is an annual herb producing a flowering stem up to about 45 centimeters high. The pinnately lobed linear to lance-shaped leaves are mostly located around the base of the plant. The lobes are generally threadlike to linear. The inflorescence is a flower head borne singly lined with hairy-based phyllaries, usually 20 to 26 or more in 2 to 3 or more series. Each bract often has a red midstripe. The 16–20 millimetres (0.6–0.8 in) head bears rings of ray florets, usually yellow to pale yellow, but sometimes white.
