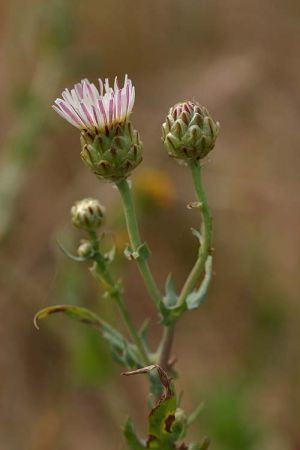

Scientific classification
- Kingdom: Plantae
- Clade: Tracheophytes
- Clade: Angiosperms
- Clade: Eudicots
- Clade: Asterids
- Order: Asterales
- Family: Asteraceae
- Genus: Malacothrix
- Species: M. coulteri

Binomial name
- Malacothrix coulteri Harv. & A.Gray

Synonyms
- Malacolepis coulteri A.Heller; Malacothrix coulteri var. cognata Jeps.; Zollikoferia elquiensis Phil.

= Malacothrix coulteri =

Species of flowering plant

Malacothrix coulteri is a species of flowering plant in the family Asteraceae. It is known by the common name snake's head or snake's head desert-dandelion.

== Description ==
It is an annual herb producing a waxy, upright flowering stem up to 10–50 centimetres (4–19 1/2 in) in height. The leaves are 5–10 cm (2–4 in) long, mostly located near the base of the stem, and are toothed or not. The inflorescence is an array of flower heads about 3–5 cm (1 1/4–2 in) wide, with nearly spherical involucres of scale-like phyllaries 1–2 cm (1/2–3/4 in) wide. The bracts are green, often with dark striping or marking. The yellow or white ray florets are about 1 cm long.

=== Similar species ===
Similar species include Anisocoma acaulis and Calycoseris parryi.

== Distribution and habitat ==
It is native to the southwestern United States, and it is also an introduced species in southern South America. Its native habitat includes desert, grassland, chaparral, and other open, sandy areas.
