= Malacothrix junakii =

Conservation status
- Critically Imperiled (NatureServe)

Scientific classification
- Kingdom: Plantae
- Clade: Embryophytes
- Clade: Tracheophytes
- Clade: Spermatophytes
- Clade: Angiosperms
- Clade: Eudicots
- Clade: Asterids
- Order: Asterales
- Family: Asteraceae
- Genus: Malacothrix
- Species: M. junakii

Binomial name
- Malacothrix junakii W.S.Davis

Species of flowering plant

Malacothrix junakii is a rare species of flowering plant in the family Asteraceae known by the common names Anacapa Island desert-dandelion, Junak's desertdandelion, and Junak's malacothrix. It is endemic to Anacapa Island, one of the Channel Islands of California, where it is known from just two occurrences. It occurs in the coastal scrub of the island. It was described to science as a new species in 1997.

This is an annual herb with a branching, leafy stem up to 30 centimeters tall. The leaves are lance-shaped with toothed or lobed blades, the upper leaves with fewer, narrower lobes. The inflorescence contains several flower heads in one or more open clusters. The head is lined with hairless red-tinged green phyllaries. It contains yellow ray florets each roughly a centimeter long.

This rare species faces threats from introduced plant species on the island.
