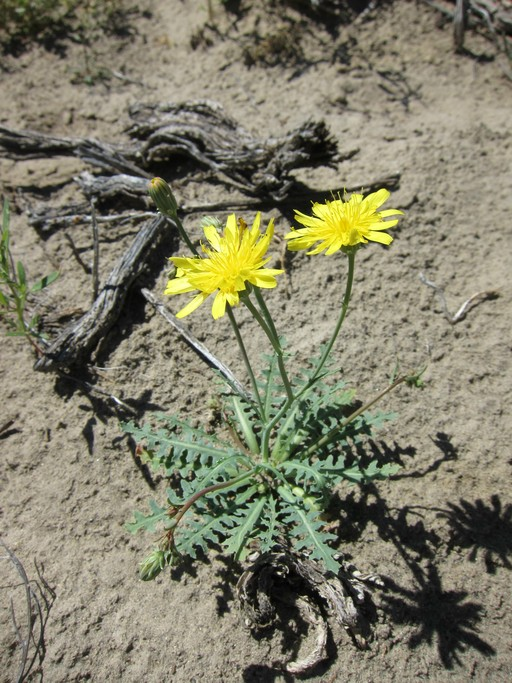

Conservation status
- Secure (NatureServe)

Scientific classification
- Kingdom: Plantae
- Clade: Tracheophytes
- Clade: Angiosperms
- Clade: Eudicots
- Clade: Asterids
- Order: Asterales
- Family: Asteraceae
- Genus: Malacothrix
- Species: M. sonchoides

Binomial name
- Malacothrix sonchoides (Nutt.) Torr. & A.Gray

= Malacothrix sonchoides =

Species of flowering plant

Malacothrix sonchoides is a species of flowering plant in the aster family known by the common names sowthistle desertdandelion and yellow saucers. It is native to much of the western United States, where it grows in sandy substrates in habitat such as Joshua tree woodland, grassland, creosote bush scrub, and ephedra-blackbrush communities.

This species is an annual herb producing one or more hairless, branching stems usually up to about 25 centimeters tall, sometimes approaching 50 centimeters. The fleshy lower leaves have several lobes, while the upper leaves are smaller and simpler. The flower heads contain up to 115 bright yellow florets each just over a centimeter long.
