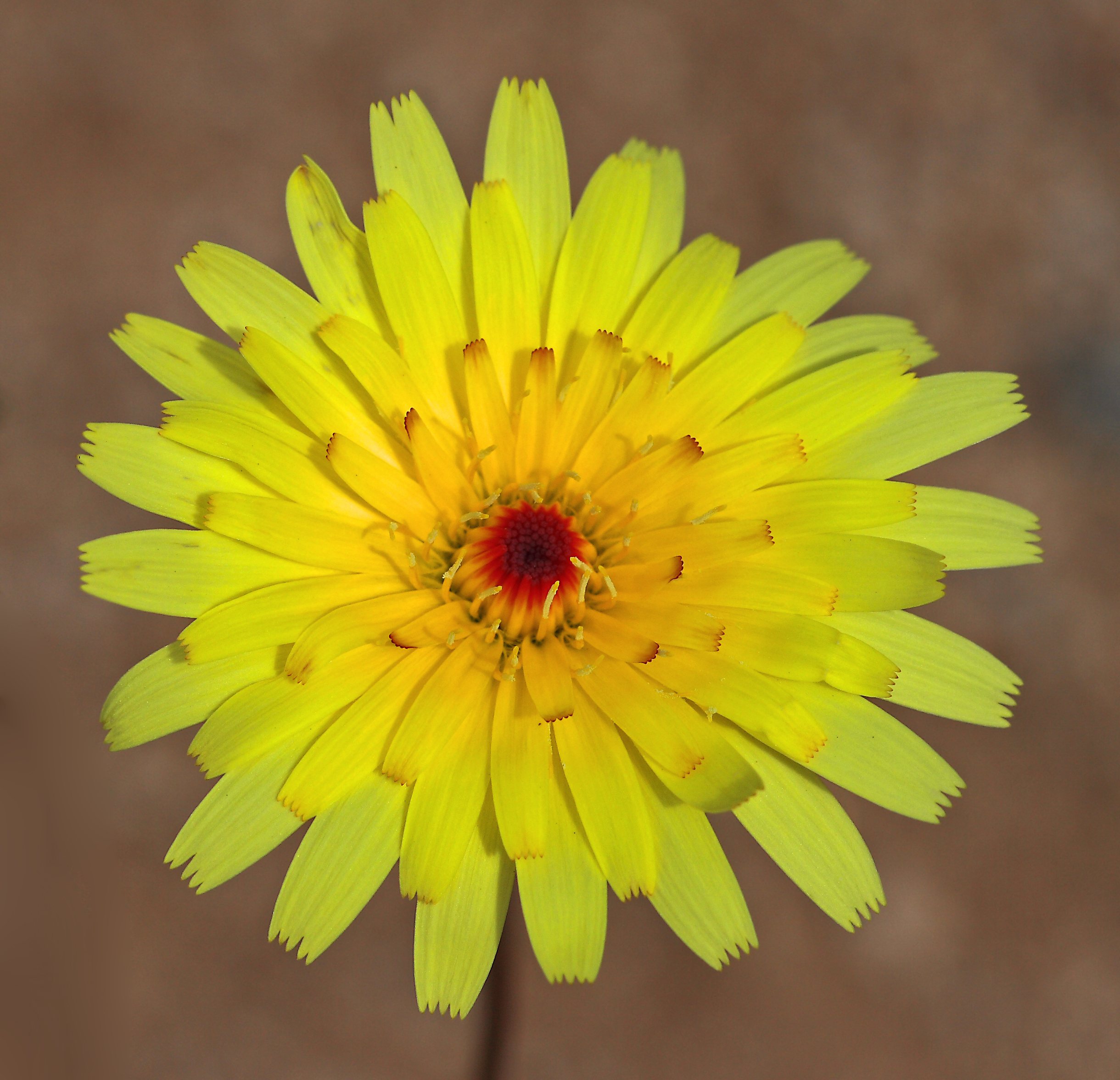

Scientific classification
- Kingdom: Plantae
- Clade: Tracheophytes
- Clade: Angiosperms
- Clade: Eudicots
- Clade: Asterids
- Order: Asterales
- Family: Asteraceae
- Genus: Malacothrix
- Species: M. glabrata

Binomial name
- Malacothrix glabrata (A.Gray ex D.C.Eaton) A.Gray

= Malacothrix glabrata =

Species of flowering plant

Malacothrix glabrata, commonly known as the smooth desert dandelion or desert dandelion, is an annual plant with yellow flowers that appears in western North America.

== Description ==
Like other members of its genus, Malacothrix glabrata has a milky sap and daisy-like flower heads. The plants grow to 15 to 40 cm (5 to 15 in) tall. The leaves are 6.5–12.5 cm (2 1/2–5 in) long, with stringy lobes. The fragrant flower heads are 2.5 to 6.5 cm (1 to 2 1/2 in) wide, composed of smaller yellow to white strap-like flowers called "ligules". In the center of the flower head may be an orange to red "button", composed of several immature flowers.

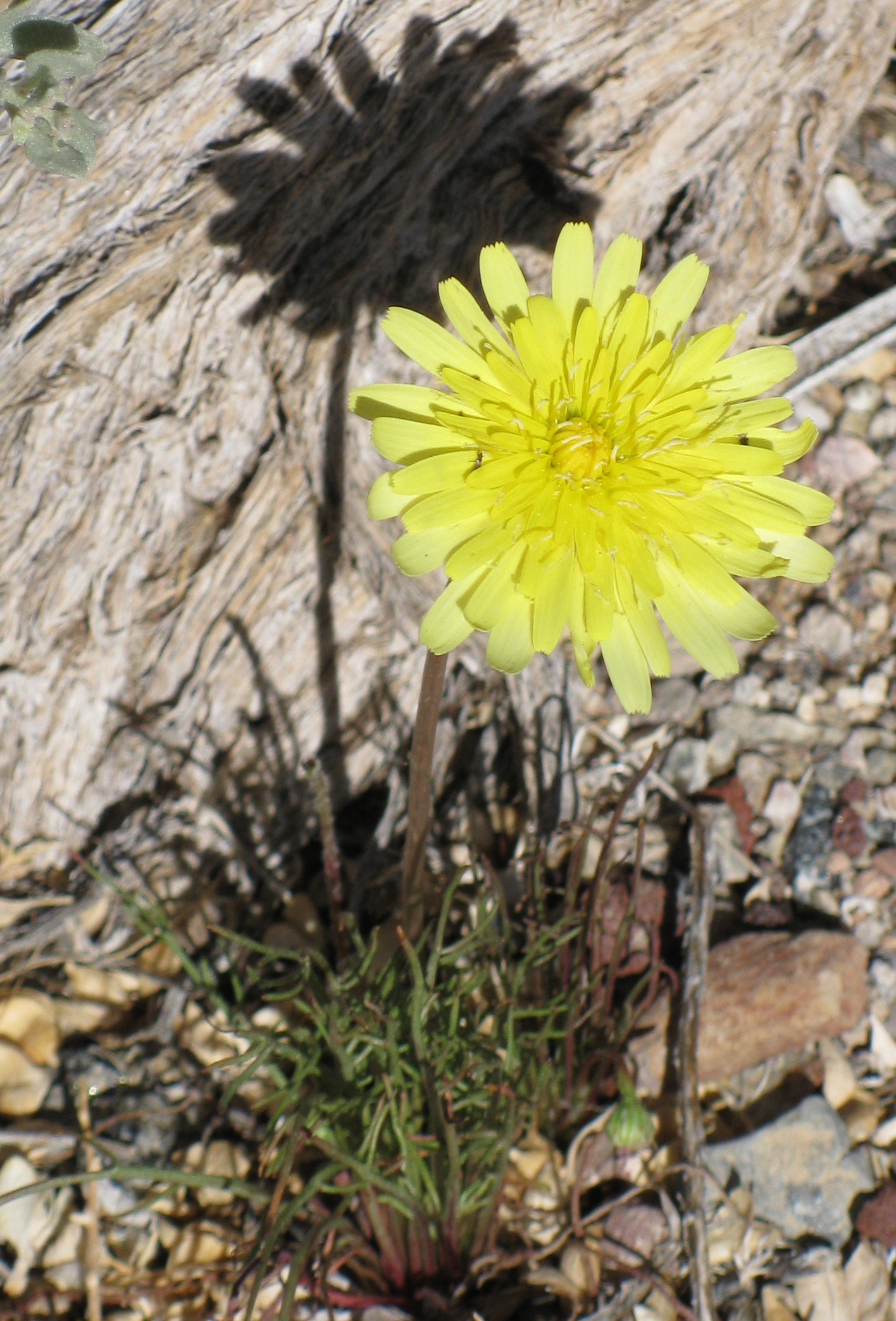
Flower and leaves

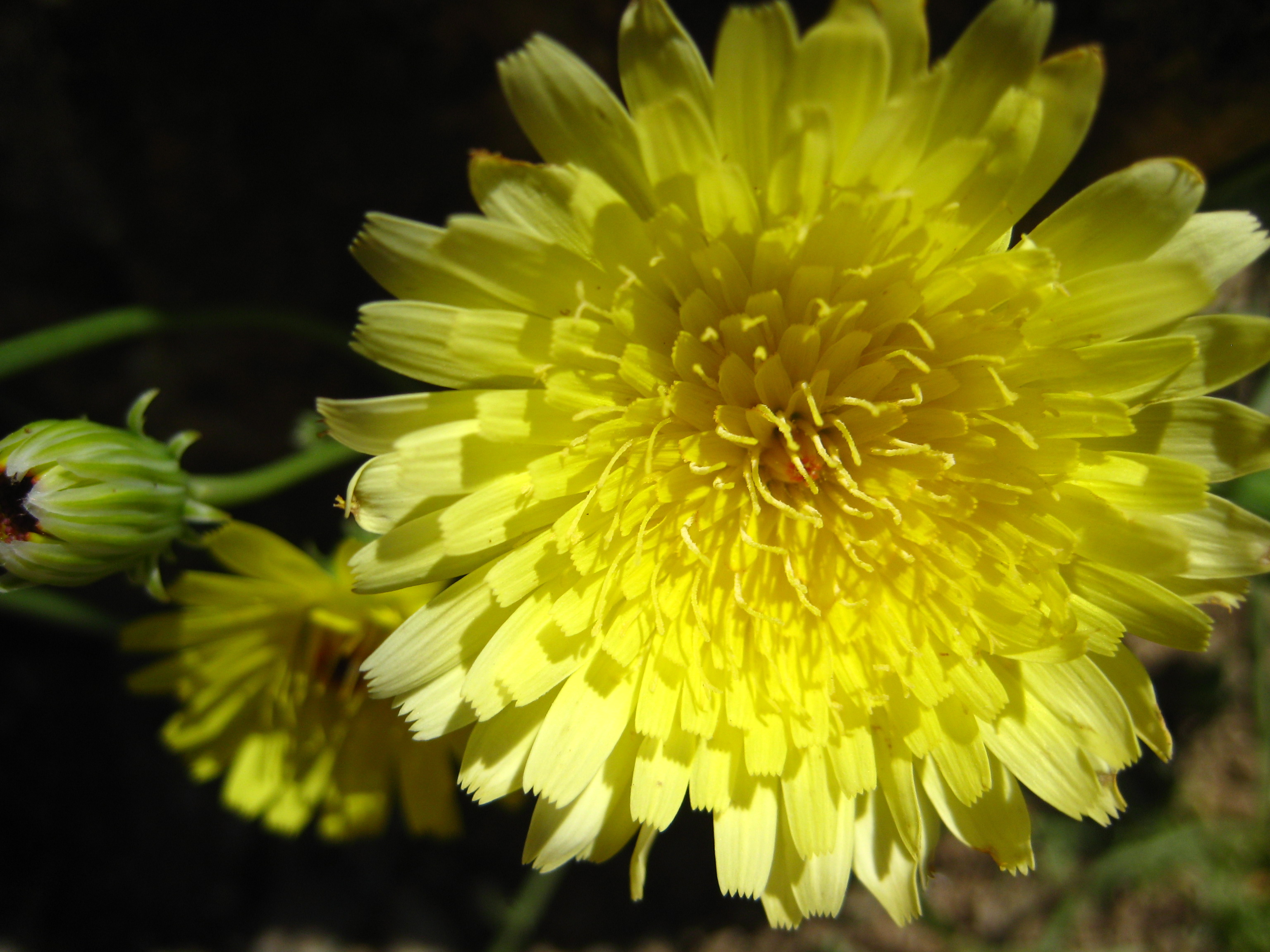
Flower close-up

== Taxonomy ==
It is a dicot in the family Asteraceae. The name "glabrata" refers to the leaves being (nearly) hairless.

== Distribution and habitat ==
The species is native to the western United States, excluding much of the Pacific Northwest, and into northern Mexico. It is common to the southwestern deserts of North America.

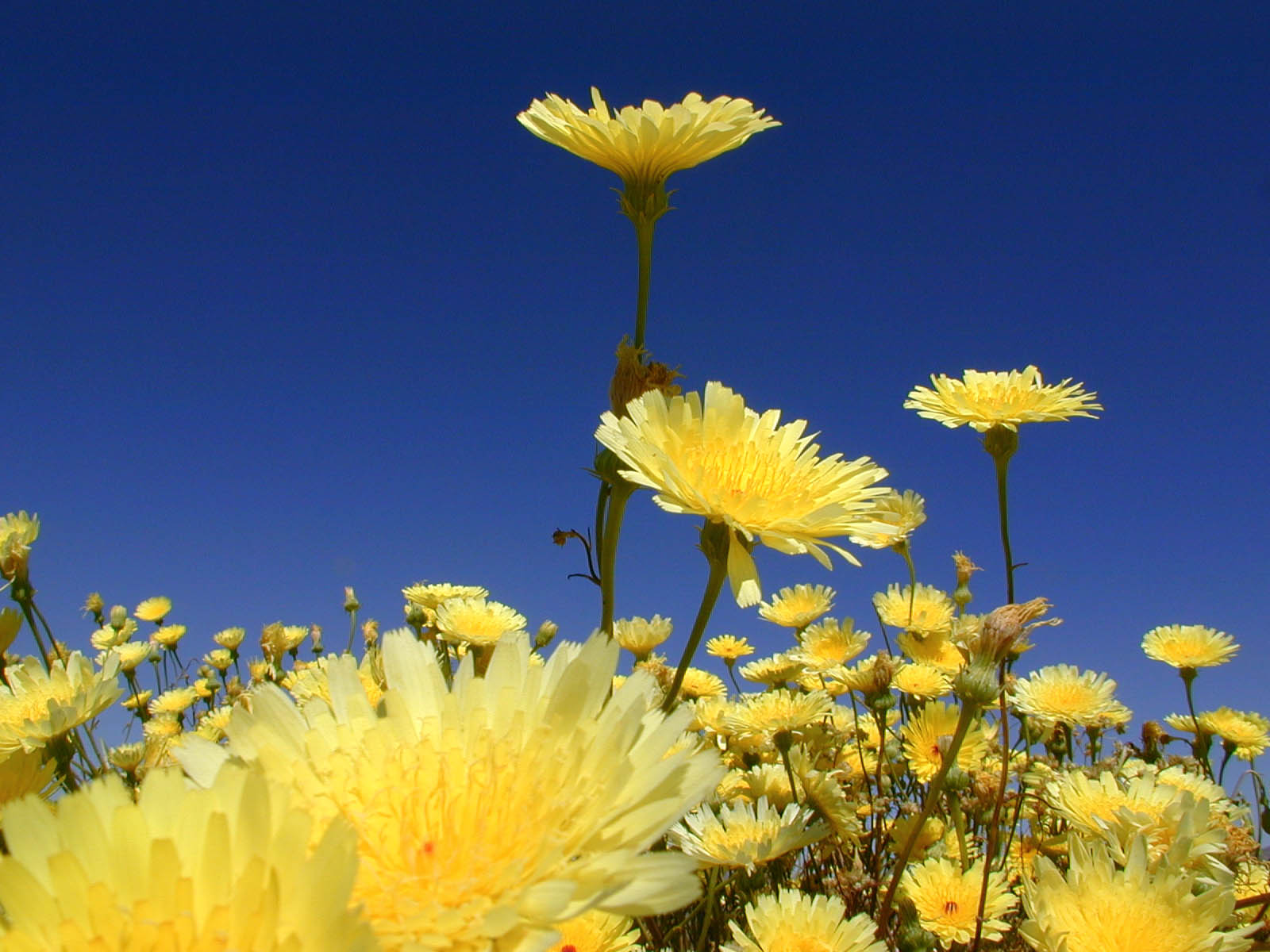
Pinto Valley, Joshua Tree National Park, California

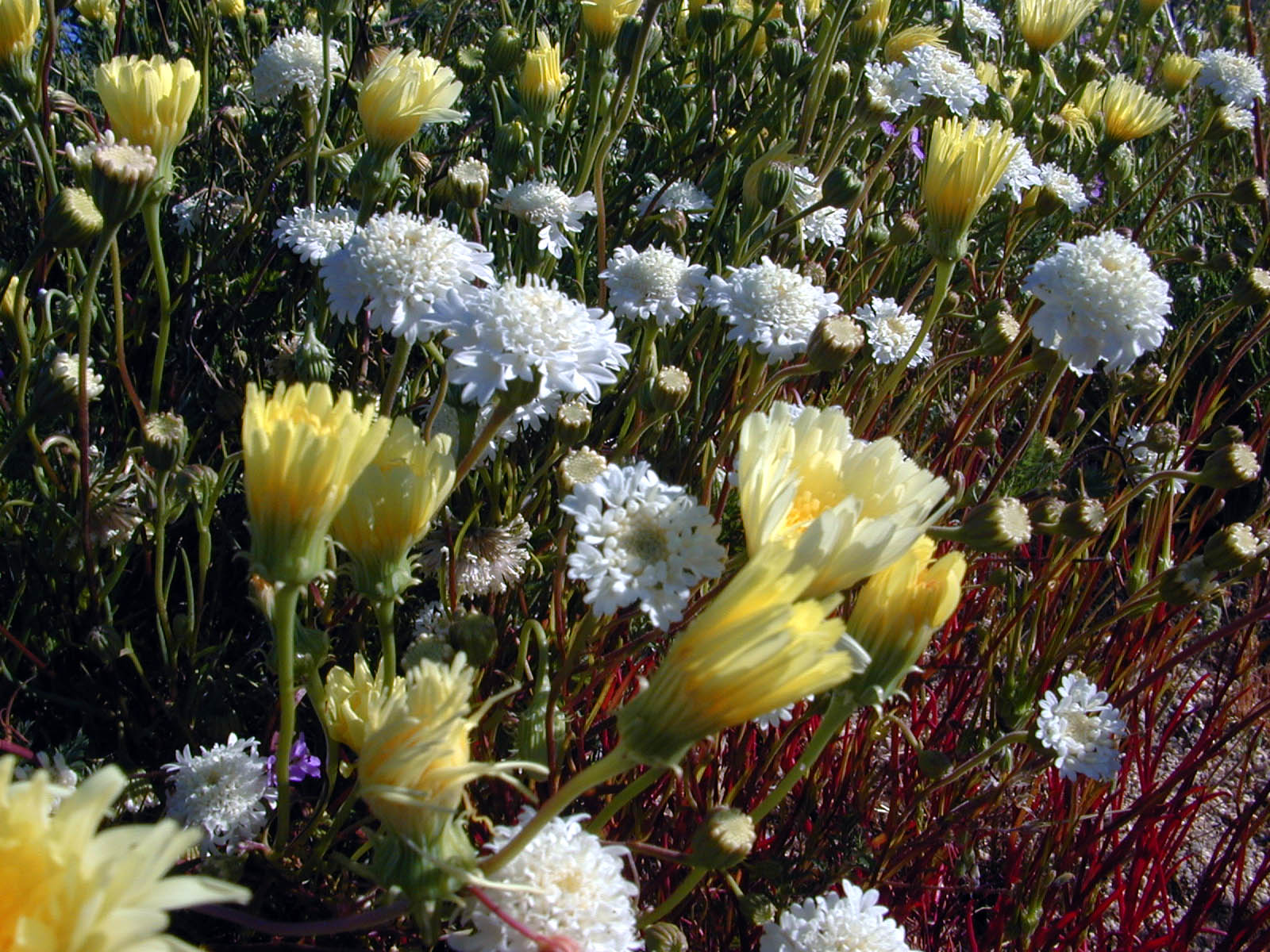
Desert dandelions and desert pincushions, Joshua Tree

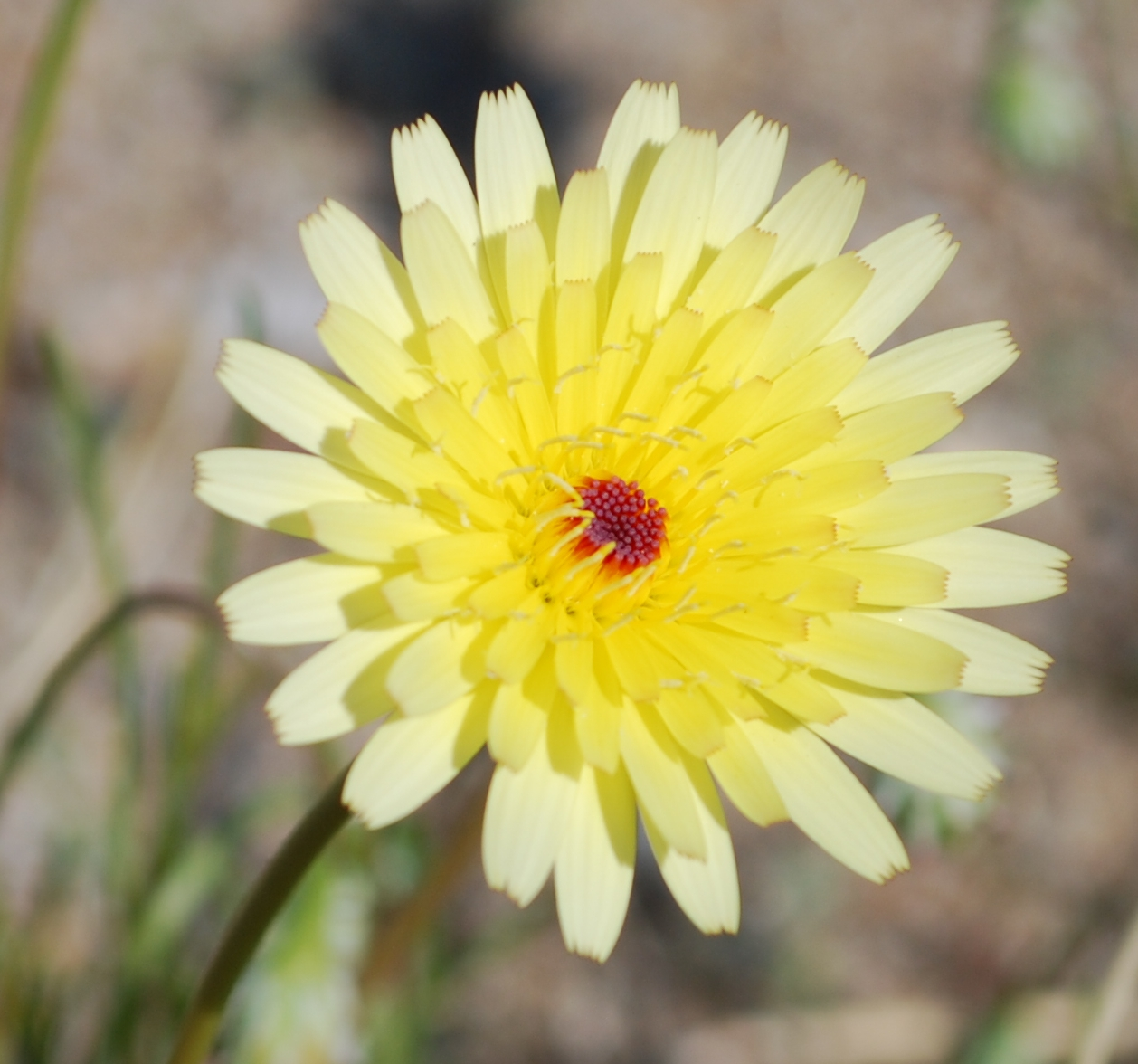
Anza-Borrego Desert State Park
