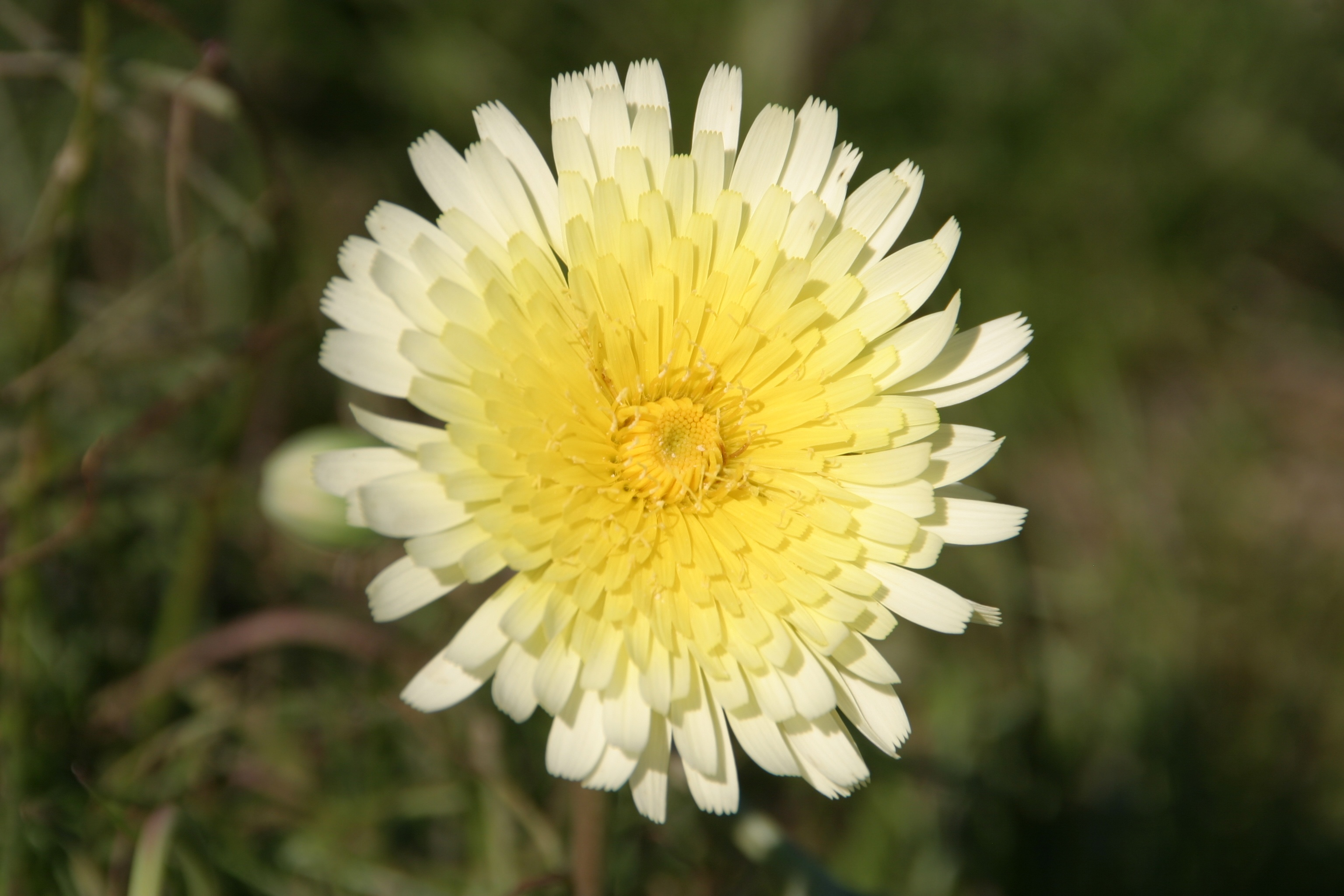
- Malacothrix floccifera, Carrizo Plain National Monument

Scientific classification
- Kingdom: Plantae
- Clade: Tracheophytes
- Clade: Angiosperms
- Clade: Eudicots
- Clade: Asterids
- Order: Asterales
- Family: Asteraceae
- Genus: Malacothrix
- Species: M. floccifera

Binomial name
- Malacothrix floccifera (DC.) S.F.Blake

= Malacothrix floccifera =

Species of flowering plant

Malacothrix floccifera is a species of flowering plant in the family Asteraceae known by the common name woolly desertdandelion. It is native to many of the northern and central mountain ranges of California, including the Sierra Nevada, where its distribution extends into Nevada. Its habitat includes forests, woodlands, and chaparral. It is an annual herb that produces a hairless flowering stem reaching a maximum height of up to about 42 centimeters. The fleshy oblong leaves are cut into teeth or lobes and have cottony patches of woolly fibers. The inflorescence is an array of flower heads lined with hairless phyllaries. The ray florets are up to 1.5 centimeters long and are often white, but sometimes yellow.
