= Malacothrix indecora =

Conservation status
- Endangered (ESA)

Scientific classification
- Kingdom: Plantae
- Clade: Tracheophytes
- Clade: Angiosperms
- Clade: Eudicots
- Clade: Asterids
- Order: Asterales
- Family: Asteraceae
- Genus: Malacothrix
- Species: M. indecora

Binomial name
- Malacothrix indecora Greene

Species of flowering plant

Malacothrix indecora is a rare species of flowering plant in the family Asteraceae known by the common name Santa Cruz Island desertdandelion. It is endemic to the Channel Islands of California, where it is known from only a few populations on three of the eight islands. As of 2000, there were three occurrences on San Miguel Island, two on Santa Rosa Island, and one on Santa Cruz Island. It grows on the bluffs and rocky coastal grasslands of the islands. Like many Channel Islands endemics, this plant is naturally limited in distribution and has been threatened by the presence of destructive introduced mammals, in this case, feral pigs. The plant became a federally listed endangered species in 1997. This is a mat-forming annual herb which spreads low to the ground no more than about 10 centimeters high. The fleshy leaves have dull lobes. The inflorescence is an array of flower heads lined with oval-shaped phyllaries. The ray florets are under a centimeter long and yellow in color.
