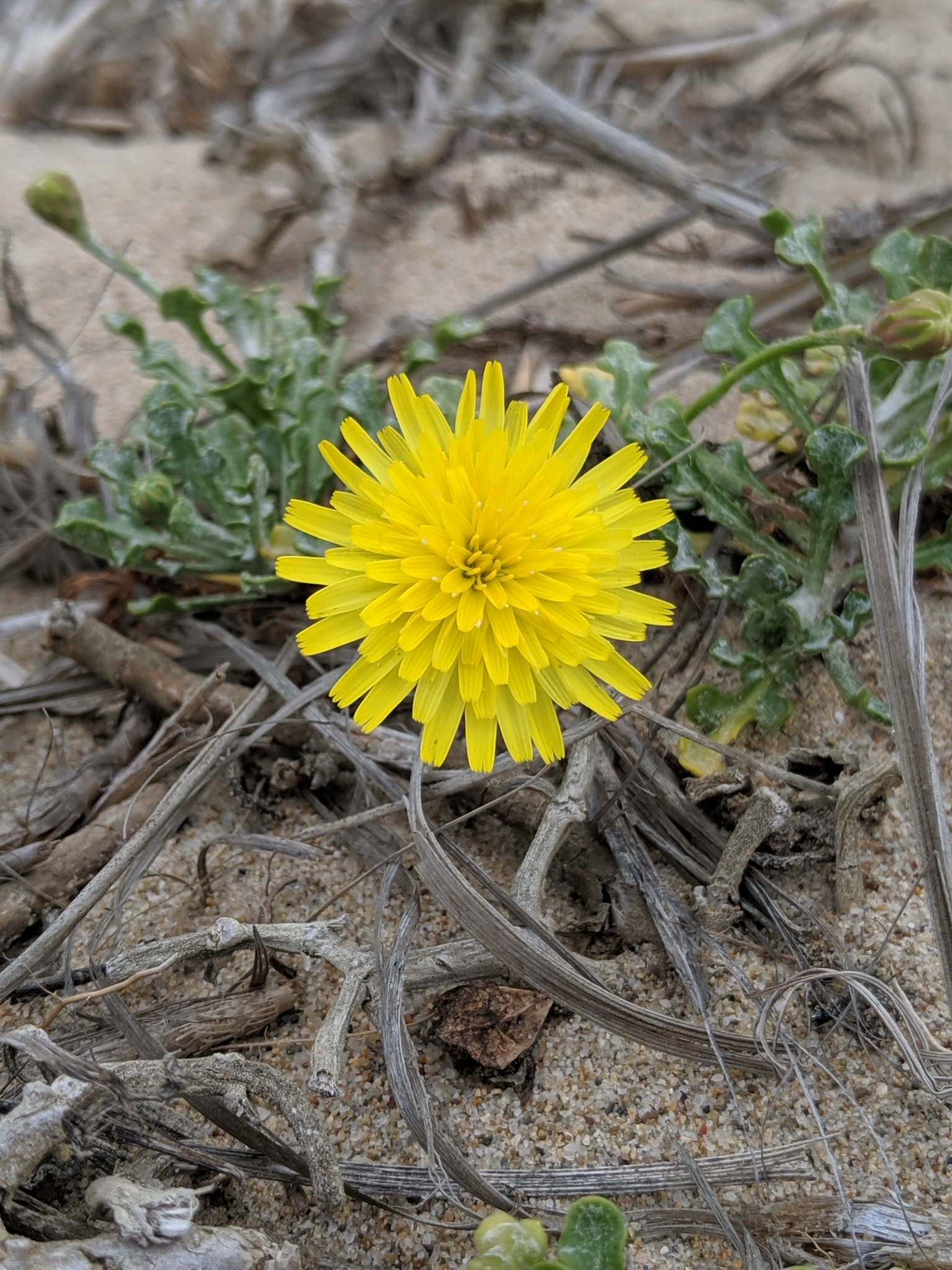

Conservation status
- Apparently Secure (NatureServe)

Scientific classification
- Kingdom: Plantae
- Clade: Tracheophytes
- Clade: Angiosperms
- Clade: Eudicots
- Clade: Asterids
- Order: Asterales
- Family: Asteraceae
- Genus: Malacothrix
- Species: M. incana

Binomial name
- Malacothrix incana (Nutt.) Torr. & A.Gray

Synonyms
- Malacomeris incanus Nutt.; Malacothrix incana var. succulenta (Elmer) J.K.Williams; Malacothrix succulenta Elmer

= Malacothrix incana =

Species of flowering plant

Malacothrix incana is an uncommon species of flowering plant in the family Asteraceae known by the common name dunedelion. This species is a mounding shrub with wooly leaves. It is endemic to California, where it grows only in sand dunes on the beaches of the Channel Islands and isolated spots along the mainland coastline in San Luis Obispo and Santa Barbara Counties. Malacothrix incana was first collected in San Diego, far south of its present range, but the plant is now extirpated from there.

== Description ==
This is a perennial herb forming a leafy mound up to about 70 centimeters in maximum height. It may be hairless to densely hairy. The leaves are smooth-edged or have dull lobes. Leaves at the base of the stem are similar to those distal. The inflorescence is an array of flower heads lined with hairless phyllaries. The ray florets are one or two centimeters long and yellow in color.

== Taxonomy ==
In 1841, Thomas Nuttall collected the type specimen in San Diego, probably on the dunes of the Silver Strand on Coronado Island. The same year, Nuttall described the species as Malacomeris incanus. In 1843, John Torrey and Asa Gray gave the species its current combination, Malacothrix incana.

== Distribution and habitat ==
This species is a coastal dune endemic, and is only found in the U.S. state of California. Some of the dune habitats it grows in have been damaged. It is found on the mainland in Santa Barbara and San Luis Obispo counties, and also on the Channel Islands of San Miguel, San Nicolas, Santa Cruz, and Santa Rosa. Where dunes transition into areas of normal soil, hybrids with other Malacothrix species may be found. It was formerly known from the Silver Strand beach in San Diego, much to the south of its current range, but it is now locally extinct there due to the loss of its habitat.
