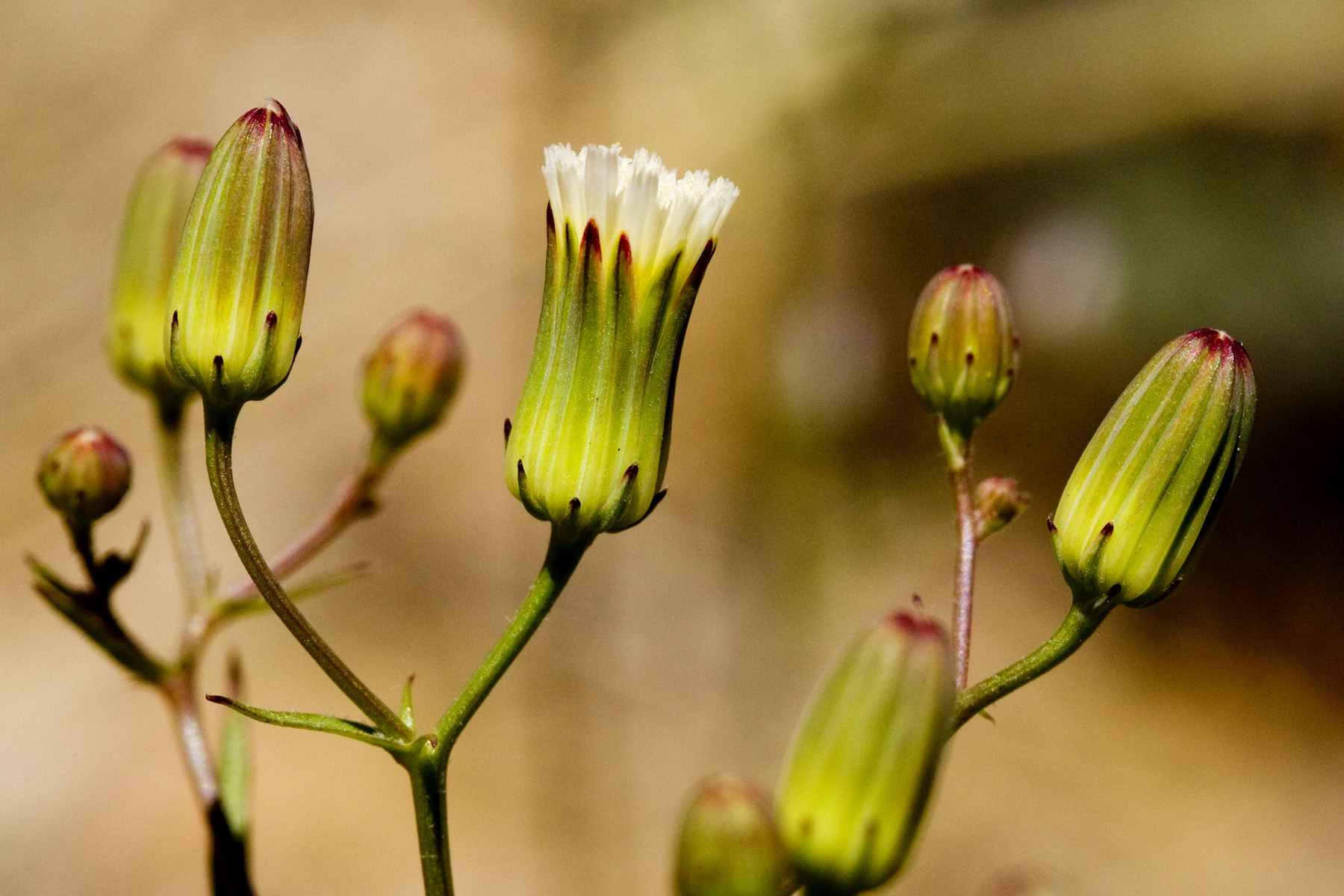
- Malacothrix stebbinsii

Scientific classification
- Kingdom: Plantae
- Clade: Tracheophytes
- Clade: Angiosperms
- Clade: Eudicots
- Clade: Asterids
- Order: Asterales
- Family: Asteraceae
- Genus: Malacothrix
- Species: M. stebbinsii

Binomial name
- Malacothrix stebbinsii W.S.Davis & P.H.Raven

= Malacothrix stebbinsii =

Species of flowering plant

Malacothrix stebbinsii is a species of flowering plant in the family Asteraceae known by the common name Stebbins' desertdandelion. It is native to the southwestern United States and northern Mexico where it grows in deserts, scrub, and woodlands. It is an annual herb producing a hairless stem up to about 60 centimeters in maximum height. The leaves are lined with narrow lobes. The inflorescence is an array of flower heads with ray florets under a centimeter long and white to light yellow in color.
