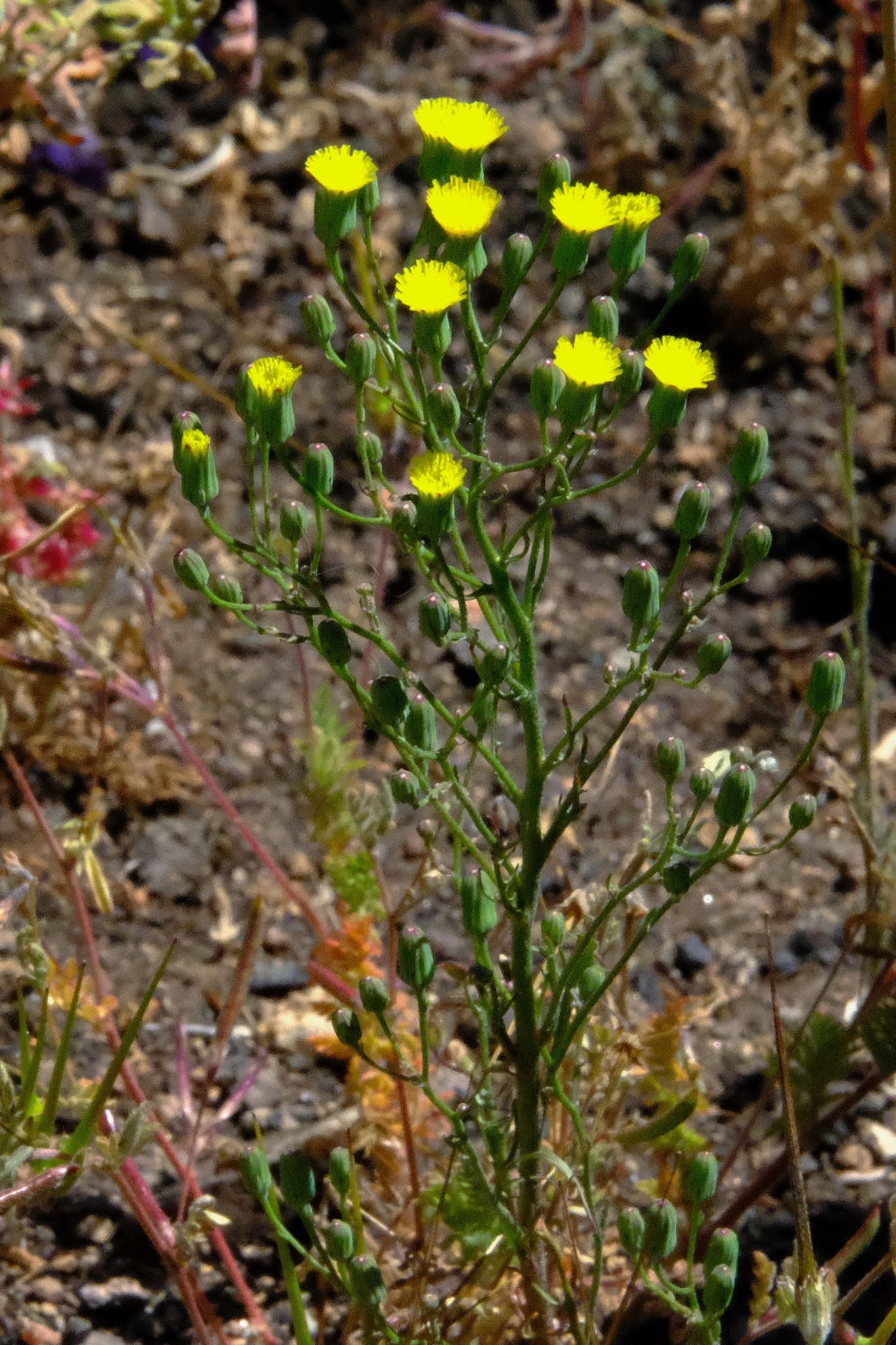

Scientific classification
- Kingdom: Plantae
- Clade: Tracheophytes
- Clade: Angiosperms
- Clade: Eudicots
- Clade: Asterids
- Order: Asterales
- Family: Asteraceae
- Genus: Malacothrix
- Species: M. clevelandii

Binomial name
- Malacothrix clevelandii A.Gray

= Malacothrix clevelandii =

Species of flowering plant

Malacothrix clevelandii is a species of flowering plant in the family Asteraceae known by the common name Cleveland's desertdandelion. It is native to parts of the southwestern United States and Baja California, where it can be found most often in chaparral, including cleared and disturbed areas such as slopes recently burned by wildfire. The plant is also found in southern South America where it is an introduced species. It is an annual herb producing a flowering stem up to about 35 centimeters in maximum height. The toothed leaves are largest at the base of the plant, and reduced higher up. The inflorescence is an array of flower heads each bearing rings of pale yellow ray florets roughly half a centimeter long.

Its specific epithet clevelandii honors 19th-century San Diego–based plant collector and lawyer Daniel Cleveland.
