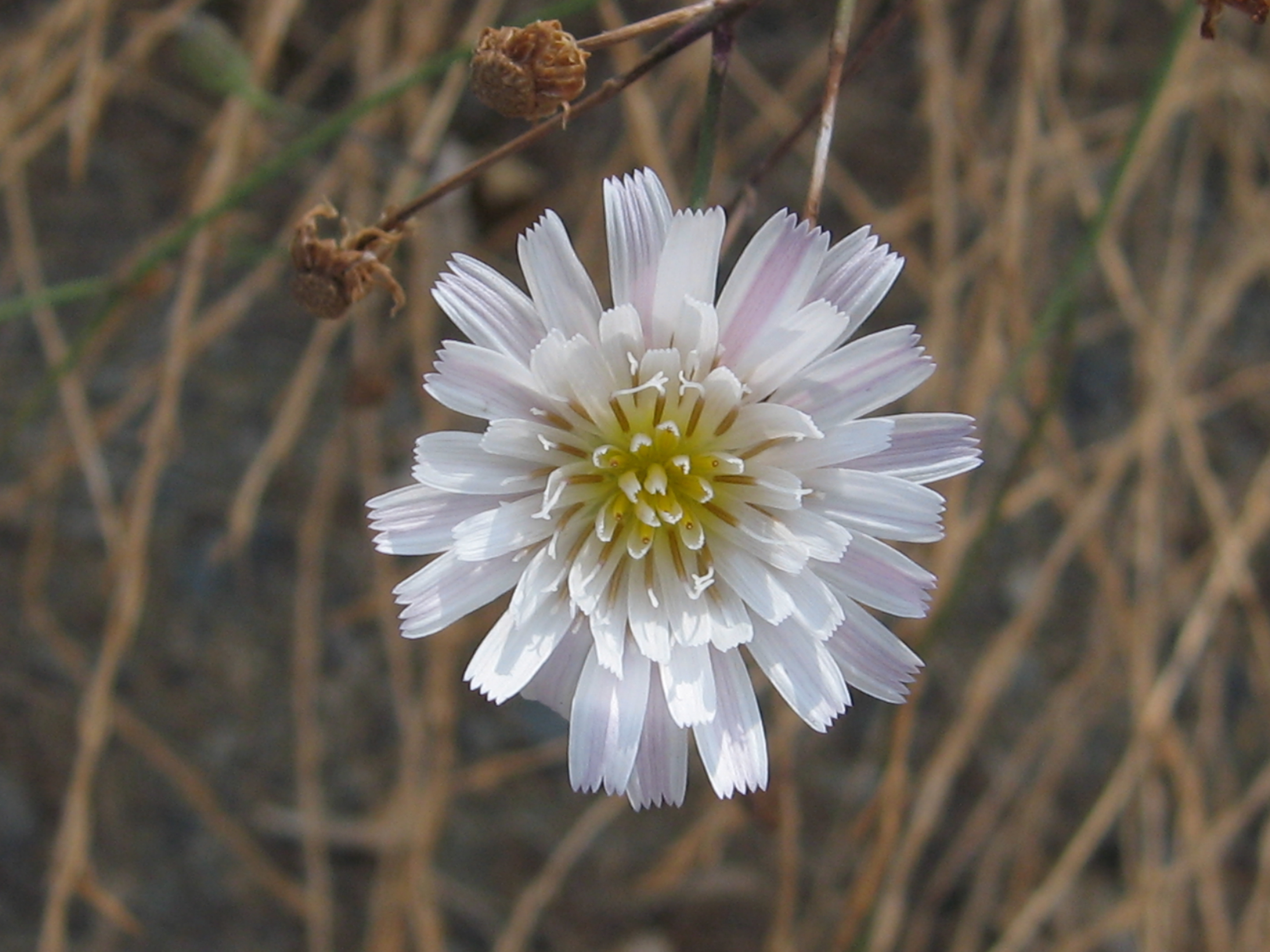

Scientific classification
- Kingdom: Plantae
- Clade: Tracheophytes
- Clade: Angiosperms
- Clade: Eudicots
- Clade: Asterids
- Order: Asterales
- Family: Asteraceae
- Genus: Malacothrix
- Species: M. saxatilis

Binomial name
- Malacothrix saxatilis (Nutt.) Torr. & A.Gray

= Malacothrix saxatilis =

Species of flowering plant

Malacothrix saxatilis is a species of flowering plant in the family Asteraceae known by the common names cliff desertdandelion or cliff aster. It is endemic to California, where it grows in the central and southern coastal hills and mountain ranges. It is a perennial herb growing 30 to 60 centimeters tall from a rhizome and caudex unit. The leaves are variable in size and shape and may be lobed or not. The inflorescence is an array of flower heads lined with lance-shaped phyllaries. The ray florets are 1 or 2 centimeters long and white in color.

There are five varieties which intergrade, some of which are very limited in distribution.
