= Anacapa Island =

Island of the Channel Islands in California, United States

Coordinates: 34°00′14″N 119°23′41″W

Native name: Ennepah, 'Anyapakh
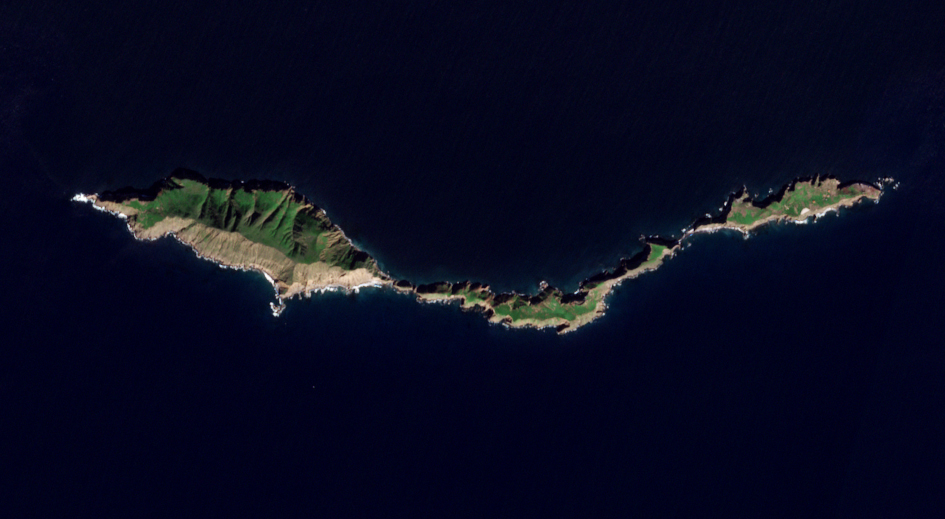
- Satellite view of Anacapa Island

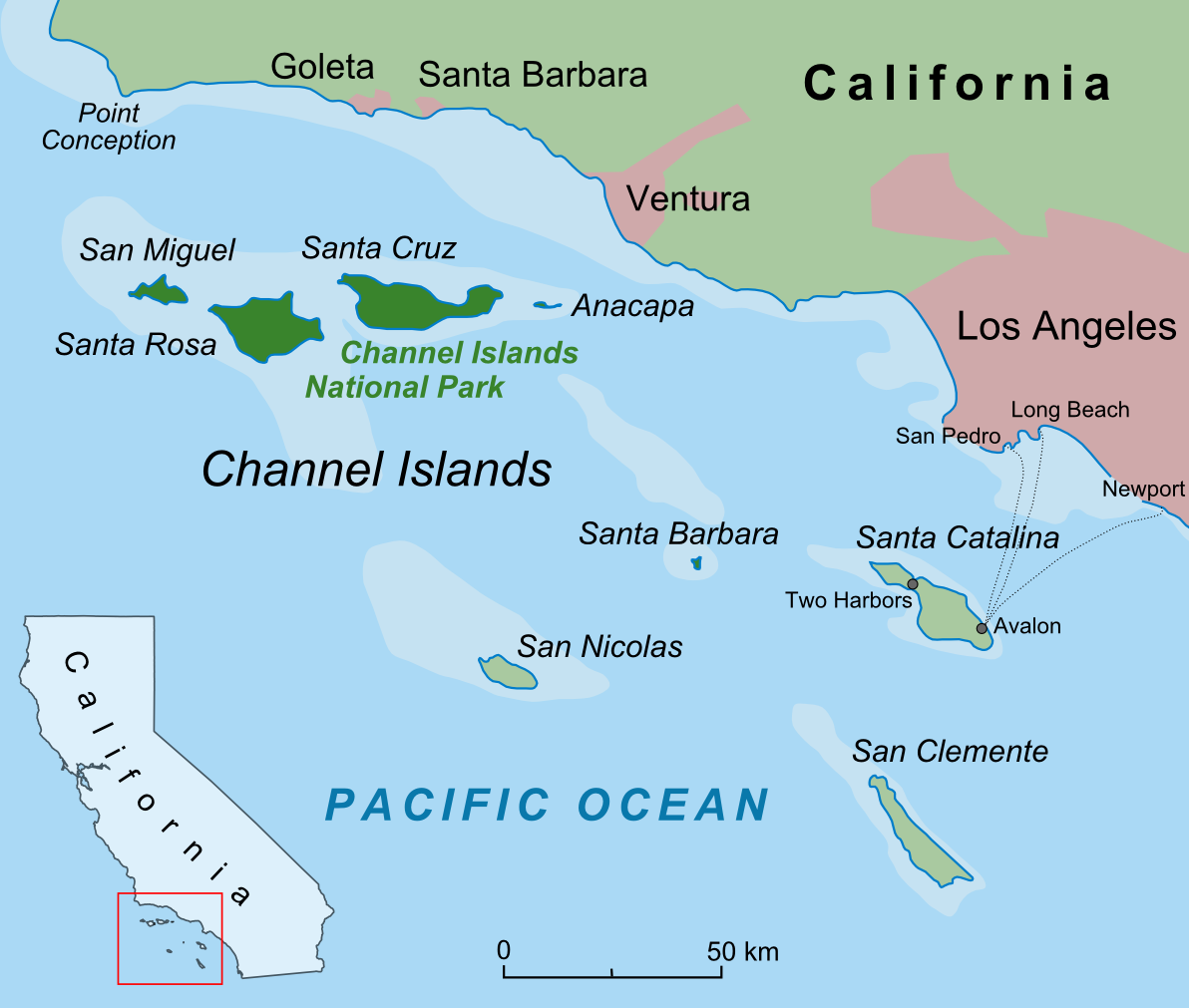
- Location within USA California Channel Islands Location within southern California
- Etymology: mirage island

Geography
- Location: Pacific Ocean
- Archipelago: Northern Channel Islands
- Adjacent to: Pacific Ocean
- Major islands: West, Middle, East
- Area: 699 acres (283 ha)
- Length: 5 mi (8 km)
- Width: 0.5 mi (0.8 km)
- Highest elevation: 930 ft (283 m)
- Highest point: Vela Peak/Summit Peak 2

Administration
- United States
- State: California
- County: Ventura

Demographics
- Population: 3 (2000)

Additional information
- Official website: https://www.nps.gov/chis/planyourvisit/anacapa.htm

Anacapa Island (Chumash: Anyapax, meaning "mirage, illusion") is a small volcanic island located about 11 miles (9.6 nmi; 18 km) off Port Hueneme in Ventura County, California. The island is composed of a series of narrow islets 6 mi (10 km) long, oriented generally east–west and 5 mi (8 km) east of Santa Cruz Island. The three main islets, East, Middle, and West Anacapa, have precipitous cliffs, dropping off steeply into the sea.

Anacapa is the smallest of the northern islands of the Channel Islands archipelago, and is within the Channel Islands National Park. It is 9 miles (7.8 nmi; 14 km) across the Santa Barbara Channel from the nearest point on the mainland. It lies southwest of the city of Ventura, California. The northern waters of Anacapa Island are protected by the Anacapa State Marine Reserve, which is one of the MPAs existing in the Channel Island National Park.

Public passenger access to Anacapa Island is provided by Island Packers ferry service out of either the Ventura Harbor or Channel Islands Harbor in Oxnard, California.

== Geography and geology ==
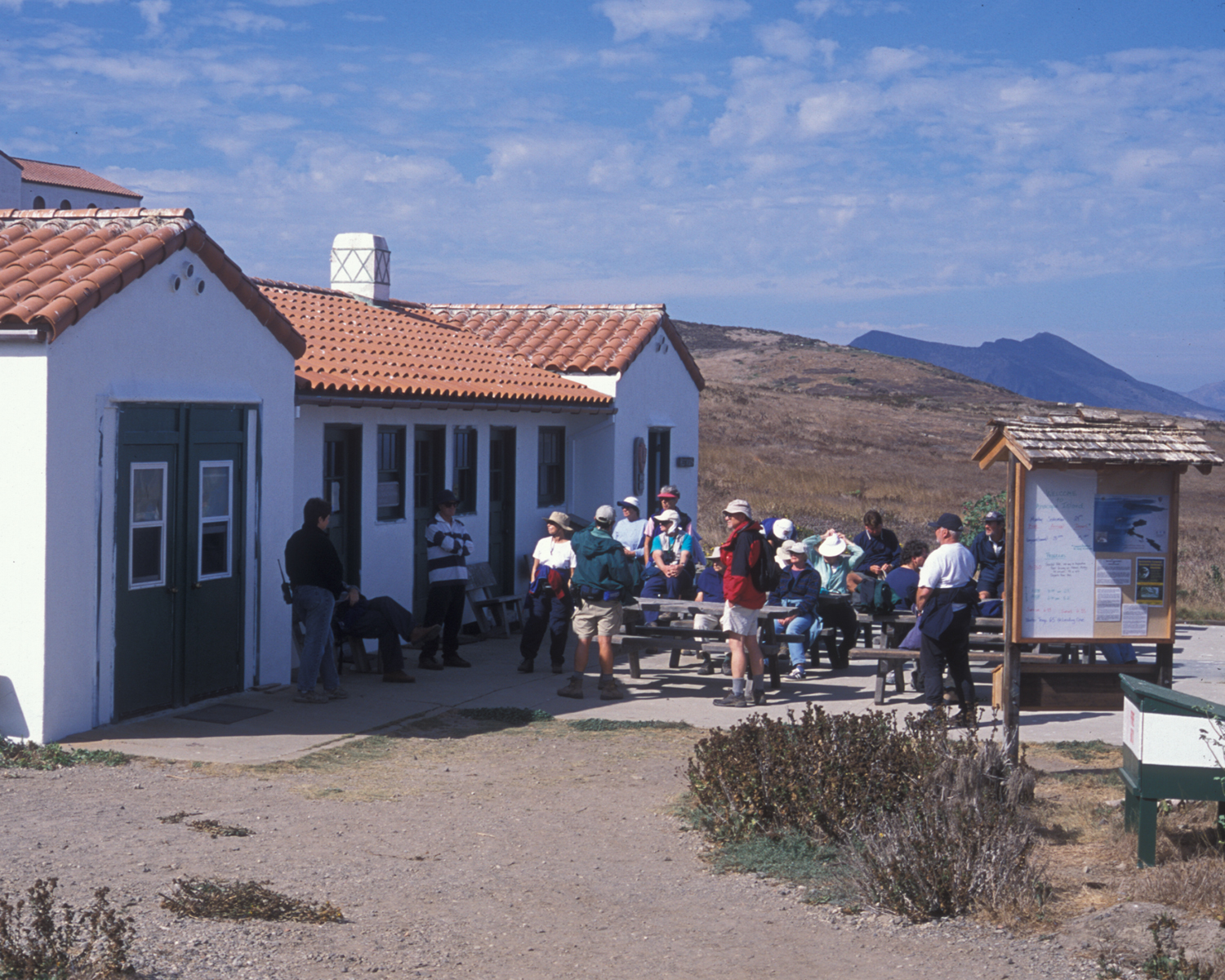
Anacapa Island Visitor Center

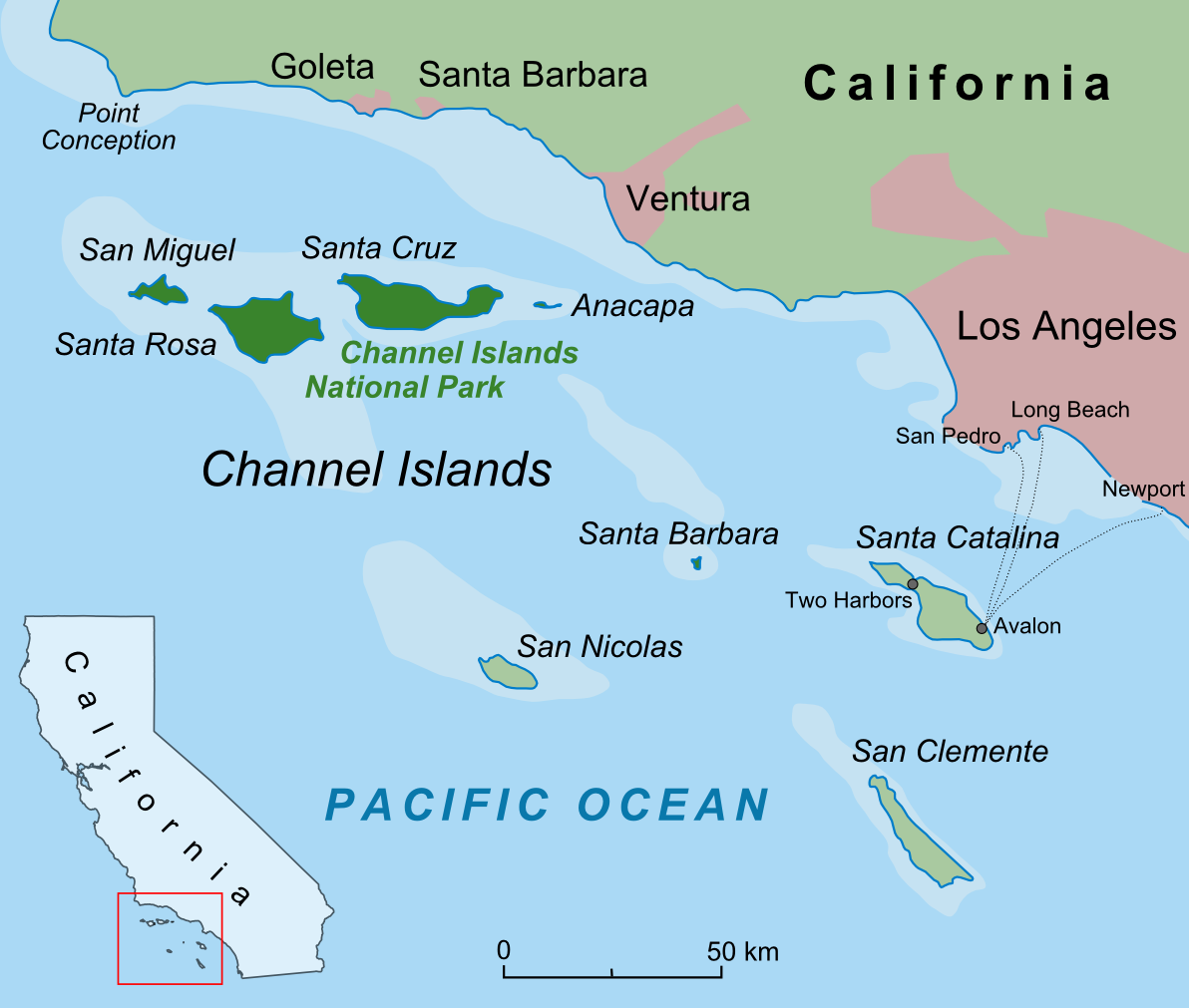
Map of Channel Islands

Along with Santa Barbara Island, Anacapa was formed by volcanic eruptions between 19 and 15 million years ago. These eruptions are believed to have been caused by thinning of ocean crust as the block containing the northern Channel Islands and Santa Monica Mountains was rotated clockwise by the transverse motion of the Pacific and North American plates. Lava from these eruptions can be found across the region, and in depths of up to 10,000 feet (3,000 m). The rocks that make up Anacapa are composed of lava, breccias, volcanic ash, and cinders.

Erosion has heavily weathered the lava formations of Anacapa, and wave action caused the island to split into three islets in recent prehistoric times. The islets display a wide variety of erosional features including sea arches, sea caves, stacks, wave-cut platforms, surge channels, and blowholes.

West Anacapa is the largest and highest islet, rising to an altitude of 930 ft (280 m) at Vela Peak, also known as Summit Peak 2. East and Middle Anacapa have fairly level areas at their tops. Middle Island reaches an altitude of 325 ft (99 m) and East Island is 250 ft (76 m) at its highest point. All three islands total 699 acres (283 ha), or about 1.1 square miles (2.8 km^{2}).

East Island's most notable natural feature is Arch Rock, a 40-foot (12 m) high natural bridge.

As recently as the end of the last ice age (about 10,000 years ago), sea levels as much as 400 ft (122 m) lower than today meant that the four northern Channel Islands were part of a single large island (dubbed "Santa Rosae") that lay about 5 miles (4 nmi; 8 km) off the California coast. Fossils of pygmy mammoths from the Late Pleistocene period 13,000 years ago have been found on the other three northern islands and it is reasonable to assume pygmy mammoths were also present on Anacapa.

In The Channel Islands of California (1910), Charles Frederick Holder says of Anacapa:

Arid appearing, desolate, wind-swept, Anacapa is withal a valuable possession to its owner, and one of the picturesque islands of the entire group. Its strange rocks, moving, passing, intermingling, made a strong impression on my mind, an impression of warring nature, conflicts of wind and rock, of seas eating into its very vitals, of caves that undermine it, and of the old rock fighting for its very life against the sea.

== Ecology ==
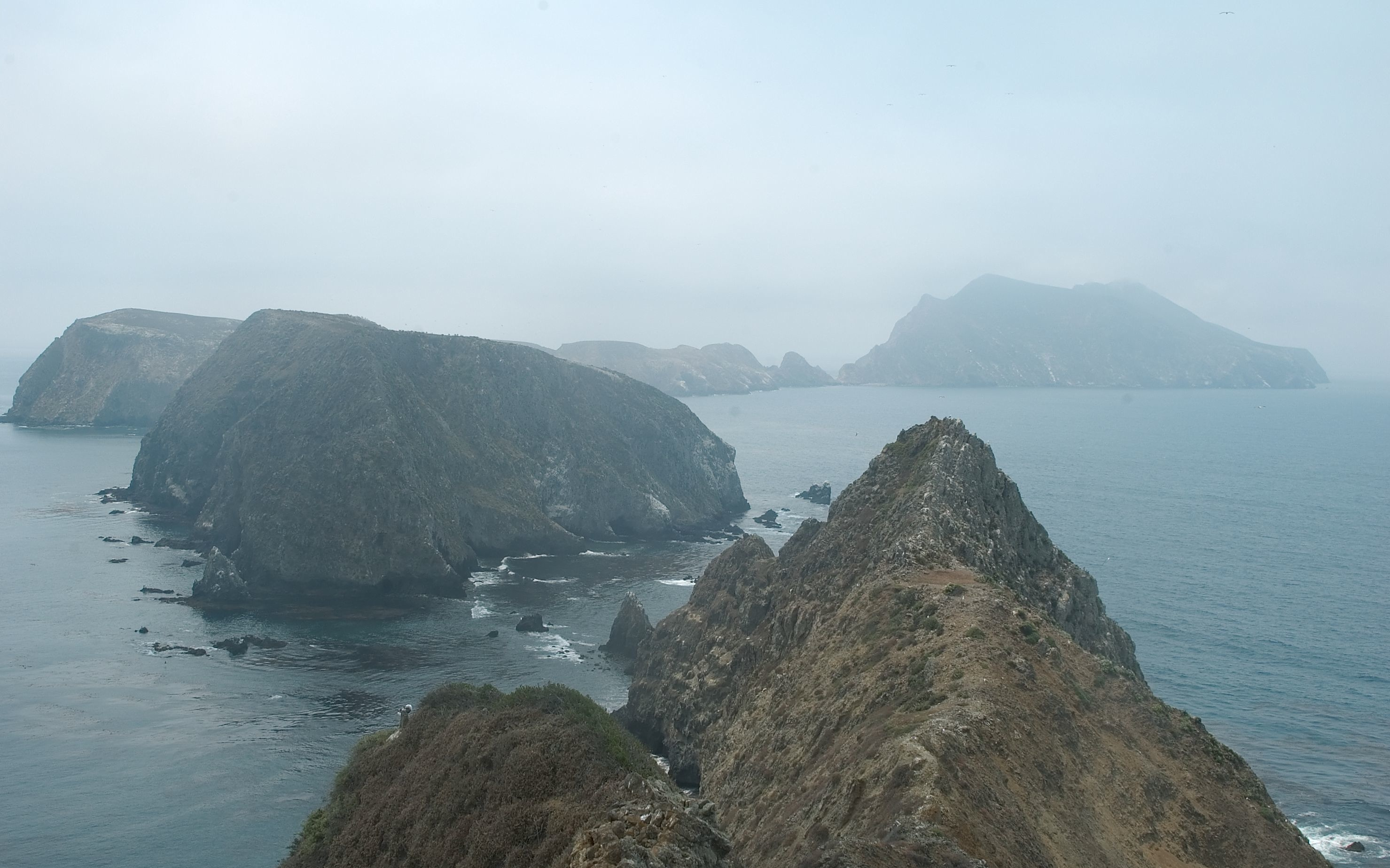
Middle and West Islets of Anacapa Island.

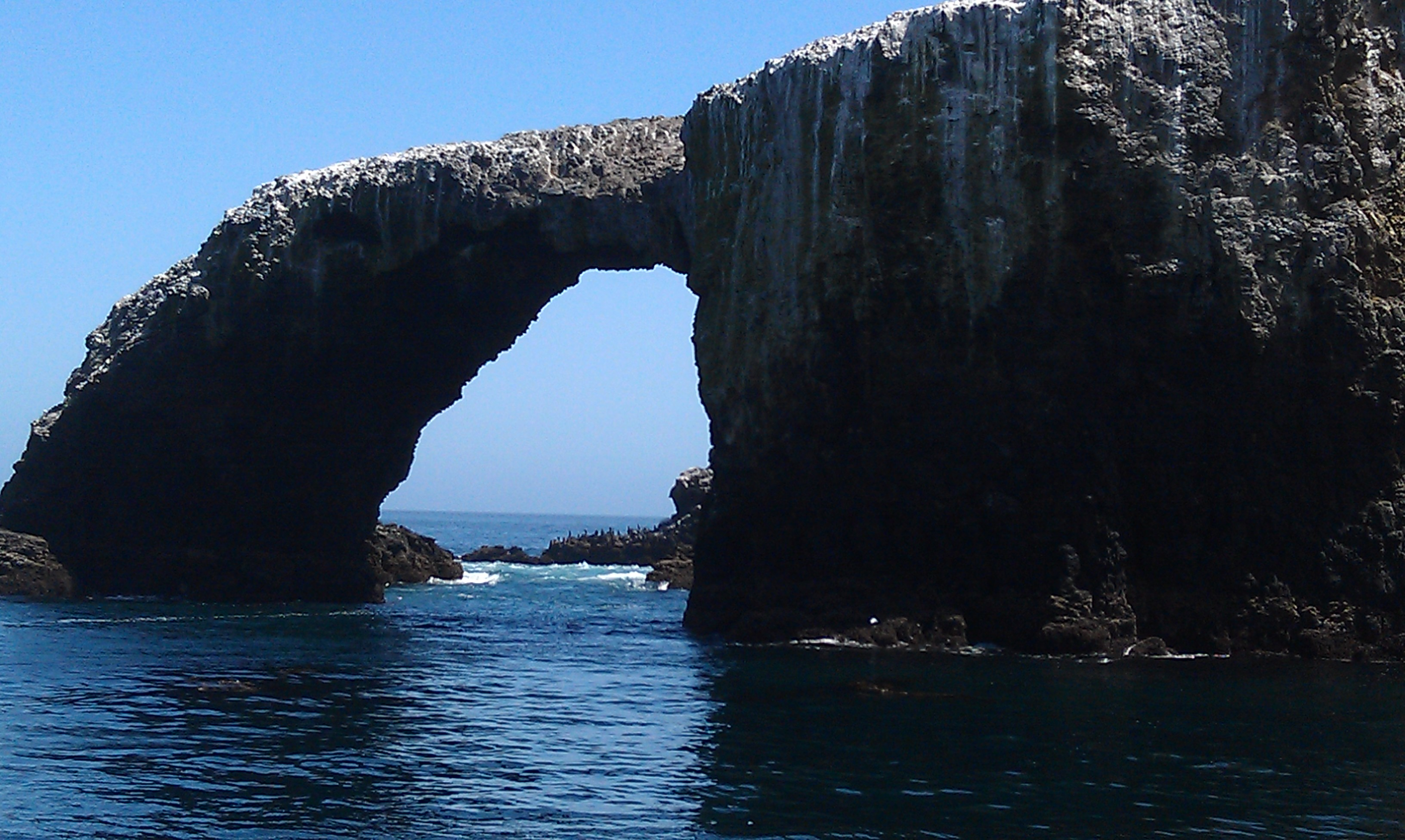
A natural bridge on the east end of the island. See below for an aerial view.

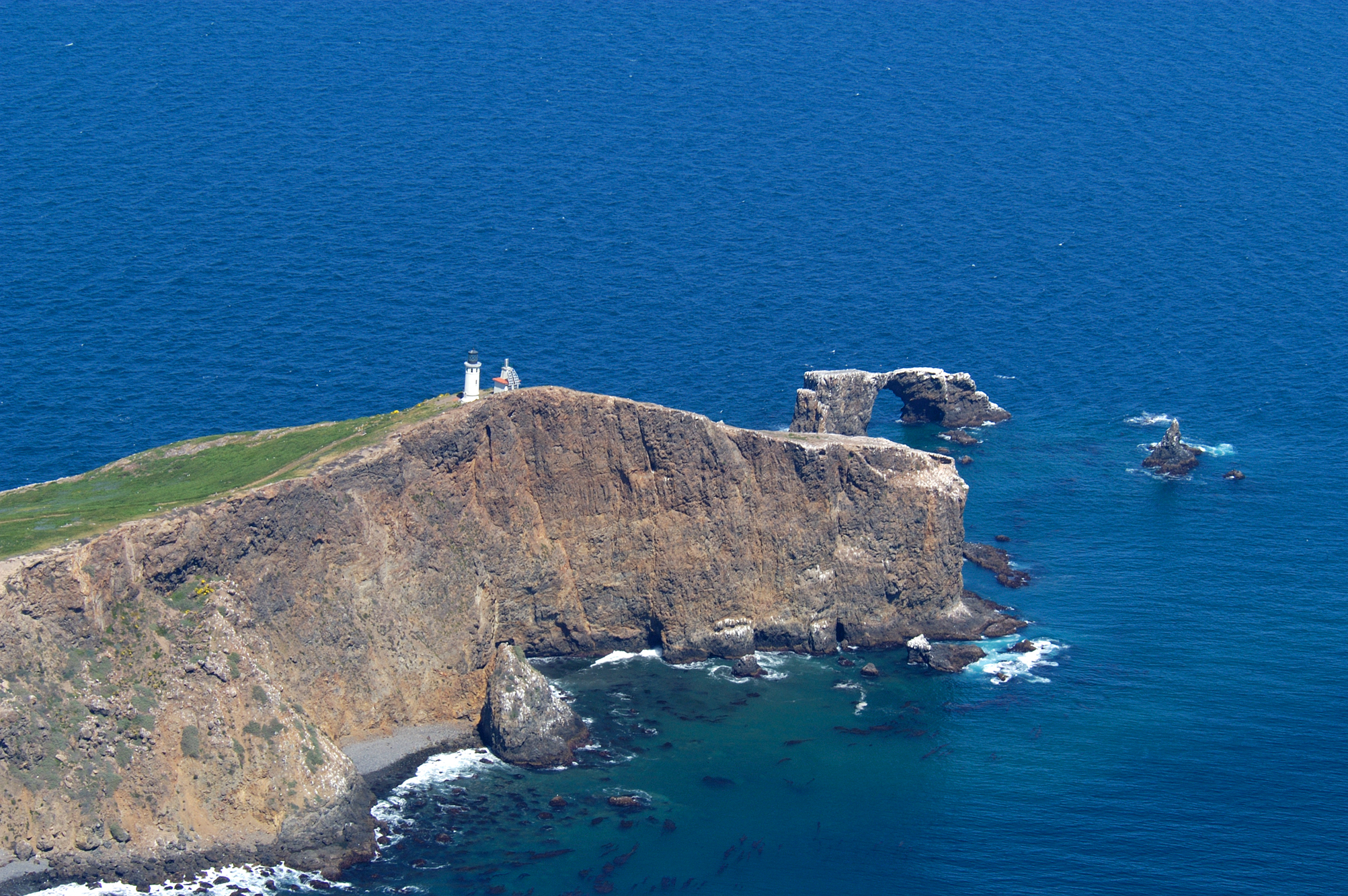
Anacapa's lighthouse is situated on the east end of the island. Sea arch (seen above) is at center right.

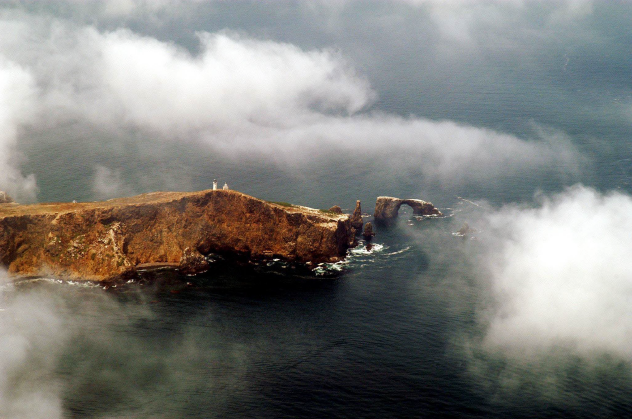
An aerial view of the island.

Anacapa Island, located only about 11 mi (10 nmi; 18 km) from the urbanized coast of Southern California], provides a critical habitat for seabirds, seals such as California sea lions, and several endemic plants and animals. Great white sharks, feeding on seals, are found in the waters of the Channel Islands, including Anacapa. The island has a somewhat diverse flora, including around 150 native plants, including 16 endemics (two of which are unique to the island) plus many introduced species.

=== Birds ===
Anacapa has around 69 species of birds. The island's steep lava rock cliffs incorporate numerous caves and crevices that are particularly important for the increasingly rare seabird Scripps's murrelet (a threatened species known as Xantus's murrelet until 2012). The cliffs are also an important location for the ashy storm-petrel. The largest breeding colony of the California brown pelican in the United States, and one of only two in California, also occurs on Anacapa Island. This is where the brown pelican has been able to recover dramatically from near-extinction in the 1970s. The islets of Anacapa also host the largest breeding colony of western gulls in the world. Western gulls begin their nesting efforts at the end of April, sometimes making their shallow nests just inches from trails. Fluffy chicks hatch in May and July and fly away from the nests in August.

=== Mammals, reptiles, and amphibians ===
The only native land mammal on the island is a unique subspecies of deer mouse (Peromyscus maniculatus anacapae), which occurs on all three islets but nowhere else. (San Clemente Island in the southern Channel Islands also has an endemic subspecies of deer mouse.)

Anacapa has two native reptiles: an endemic form of the side-blotched lizard (Uta stansburiana hesperis) and the less-common California alligator lizard (Elgaria multicarinata multicarinata). There is one amphibian, the Channel Islands slender salamander (Batrachoseps pacificus). Marine mammals and other marine life abound on Anacapa.

=== Vegetation ===
Anacapa's prolific and dense vegetation was once dominated by the showy giant coreopsis (Leptosyne gigantea) previously named Coreopsis gigantea, an erect, shrubby perennial with a stout, succulent trunk growing to some 8 ft (2 m) tall. The main trunk grows up to 5 in (13 cm) thick and often resembles a small tree. During its blooming season, March to May, it bursts forth with a mass of showy, bright yellow flowers and green leaves. Giant coreopsis provided shelter and perches for seabirds and land birds, and nesting habitat for many. The prolific seeds provided abundant food for the endemic Anacapa deer mouse, and for many small birds. The island's stands of giant coreopsis, as well as all the other plants of its coastal bluff community, were devastated by sheep grazing in the late 1800s and early 1900s, rabbit browsing in 1910-1950s, and by large-scale destruction of native vegetation associated with facility and road development by the United States Coast Guard during construction and manning of the Anacapa Light Station. Only small patches and individuals of native plants remained.

Malacothrix junakii is a rare species of aster known by the common names Anacapa Island desert-dandelion, Junak's desert dandelion, and Junak's malacothrix that is endemic to Anacapa, where it is known from just two occurrences. It occurs in the coastal scrub of the island and was described to science as a new species in 1997.

=== Introduced species ===
Introduced mammals on Anacapa Island included domestic cats, sheep, rabbits, and black rats.

Black rats (Rattus rattus), also known as ship rats, had a major impact on wildlife on Anacapa Island, including seabirds such as Scripps's murrelet, reptiles and amphibians, intertidal and terrestrial invertebrates, and vegetation. Before a rat eradication program in 2001–2002, more than 96 percent of Scripps's Murrelet nests on Anacapa were attacked by invasive rats. The rats were certainly introduced sometime prior to 1939 (when they were noted by National Park Service researchers Sumner and Bond), probably in supplies brought onto the island for sheep ranching or building the lighthouse. The National Park Service says there is evidence they were present in 1907. A 1979 study noted that they could have been introduced from a shipwreck, such as that of SS Winfield Scott in 1853.

European rabbits were introduced to East Island either as an emergency food supply for lighthouse personnel during World War II or as pets. They were present from the 1940s until at least 1965. No rabbits were recorded from Middle or West Anacapa.

Domestic cats were introduced to Anacapa as pets of the fisherman "Frenchy" after whom Frenchy's Cove on West Island is named. In 1966, there remained a small population.

Sheep were grazed on the island for many years. There are records from the 1870s through the 1930s. Many writers reported that in the absence of springs on Anacapa sheep would lick the moisture that accumulated on each other's fleeces from the coastal fog. The native flora was affected by the forage grasses that farmers introduced to feed their flocks, and by soil-compaction caused by the sheep's hooves. Reproduction of ground-nesting species such as the meadowlark and horned lark is also thought to have been harmed by grazing.

After completion of the lighthouse and associated facilities, the U.S. Coast Guard planted two types of iceplant on East Anacapa Islet: red-flowered iceplant (Malephora crocea) and sea fig, also called freeway iceplant (Carpobrotus edulis x aequilaterus). Both species are highly invasive. The National Park Service has initiated a restoration project to eradicate all of the ice plant by 2016, the centennial of the National Park Service Organic Act.

=== Restoration ===
Vegetation on Anacapa began to recover after the removal of sheep about 1938 and rabbits in the 1950s.

Black rats were successfully eradicated from Anacapa Island by 2003, under a controversial program that involved an aerial application of the rodenticide brodifacoum with the assistance of Island Conservation. This was the first time a rodenticide had been applied aerially in North America (the technique was pioneered in New Zealand). One complicating factor was the presence of the native deer mouse subspecies (Peromyscus maniculatus anacapae). This was the first time that biologists had attempted to eradicate one rodent species from an entire island where an endemic rodent was present.

A tool called Population Viability Analysis, or PVA, is a species-specific method used to assess the probability of a population's extinction in a given number of years. Based on the result of a study, PVA determined that a population of 333 deer mice had a high chance of survival. Approximately 300 deer mice were captured prior to the application of rodenticide and reintroduced after poison levels had dropped, which was about three months. The program cost about $1.8 million.

A study after the eradication project showed that nesting attempts by Scripps's murrelets on Anacapa had more than doubled, average hatching success was up from 42 to 80 percent, and average nest predation was down from 52 to 7 percent. Only four months after the rodenticide applications, Cassin's auklet (Ptychoramphus aleuticus) began nesting on Anacapa. This was significant as there were no previous records of the bird nesting on the island and it is known to be highly susceptible to rat predation.

== Climate ==
The region experiences warm and dry summers and mild winters with no average monthly temperatures above 71.6 °F (22.0 °C). Its climate is greatly moderated by the Pacific Ocean. According to the Köppen Climate Classification system, Anacapa Island has a warm-summer Mediterranean climate, abbreviated "Csb" on climate maps.

Climate data for Anacapa Island
Month	Jan	Feb	Mar	Apr	May	Jun	Jul	Aug	Sep	Oct	Nov	Dec	Year
Mean daily maximum °F (°C)	62.1 (16.7)	62.8 (17.1)	64.5 (18.1)	67.5 (19.7)	70.1 (21.2)	72.1 (22.3)	74.3 (23.5)	74.0 (23.3)	73.5 (23.1)	71.3 (21.8)	64.8 (18.2)	63.0 (17.2)	68.5 (20.3)
Mean daily minimum °F (°C)	50.8 (10.4)	50.1 (10.1)	50.7 (10.4)	52.0 (11.1)	54.7 (12.6)	57.2 (14.0)	59.2 (15.1)	60.3 (15.7)	60.1 (15.6)	58.2 (14.6)	52.2 (11.2)	51.0 (10.6)	54.9 (12.7)
Average precipitation inches (mm)	5.36 (136)	4.28 (109)	3.10 (79)	1.27 (32)	0.46 (12)	0.18 (4.6)	0.15 (3.8)	0.04 (1.0)	0.23 (5.8)	0.52 (13)	1.53 (39)	3.24 (82)	20.36 (517)
Source: Western Regional Climate Center

== History ==
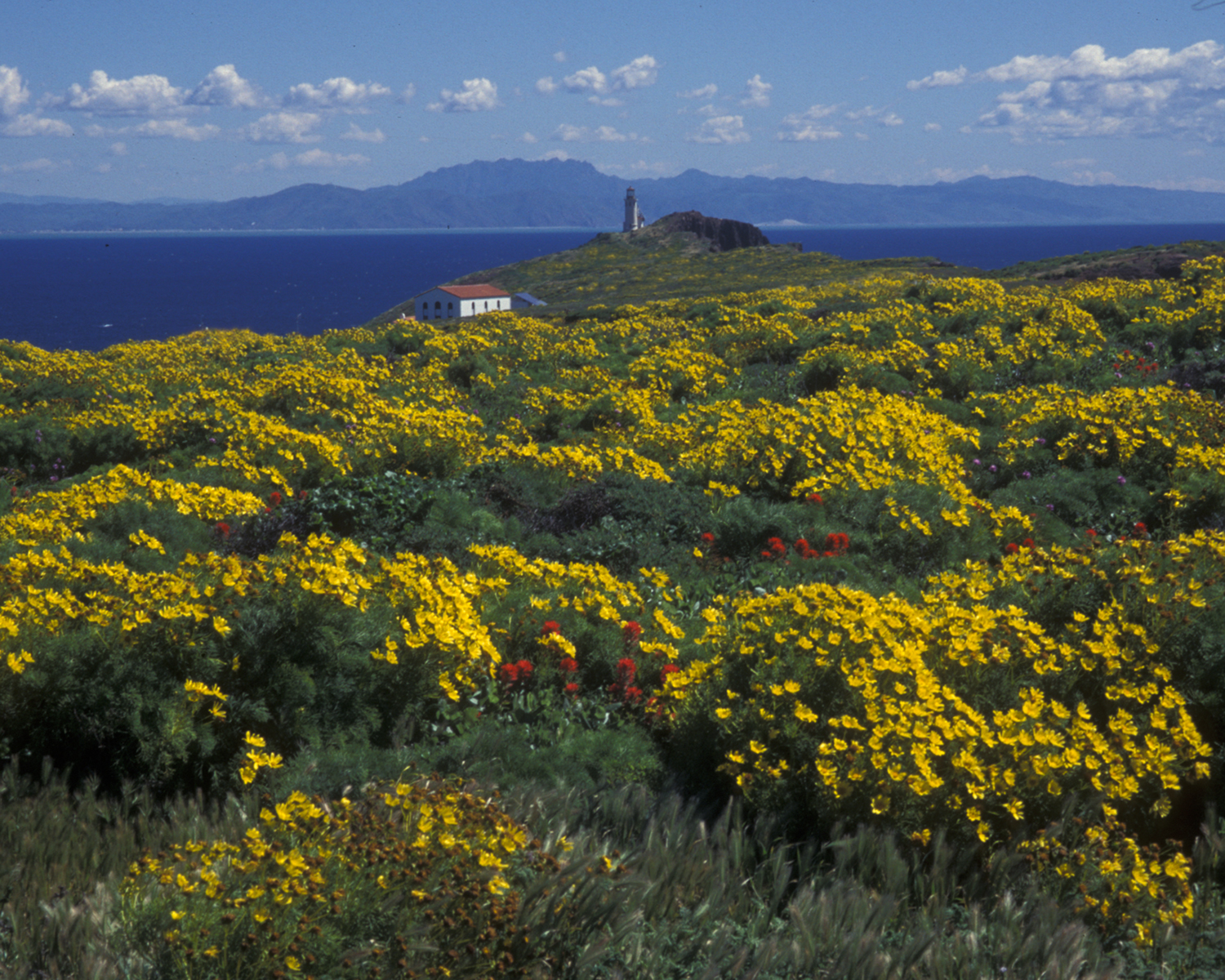
Coreopsis and a view of the Anacapa Island Light

Anacapa is the only one of the Channel Islands to have a non-Spanish-derived name. Anacapa comes from the Chumash word 'Anyapax, meaning "illusion". Juan Rodriguez Cabrillo passed by the island in 1542 and named the island San Lucas Island (Las Islas de San Lucas), but it was George Vancouver who labeled it Enecapa on his 1790 chart, while the United States Coast and Geodetic Survey labeled it Anacapa in 1854.

On the night of December 2, 1853, the sidewheel steamer SS Winfield Scott, running at full speed, crashed into the rocks off Middle Anacapa and sank. All of the passengers survived and were rescued after a week.

George Nidever was the first person to raise sheep on the island, starting in the 1850s or 1860s. Louis le Mesnager then signed a five-year lease with the United States Government around 1897, but his lease and sheep were taken over by Herman Bayfield Webster in 1907. His Sheep Camp operation was located on Middle Anacapa, which included five shacks and about 500 sheep. Ira Eaton acquired the lease in 1917 and held it until 1927, and used the island for his bootleg alcohol operation during Prohibition in the United States. The next resident of the island was Raymond "Frenchy" LeDreau, who occupied four shacks on West Anacapa at Frenchy's Cove, living as a recluse for the next 30 years, departing the island in his eighties after the island had become a national monument.

On a visit around 1910, Charles Frederick Holder noted "kitchen-middens, and deposits of ancient shells, and the tell-tale black earth" of hearths.

The United States Lighthouse Service built an acetylene-powered light and whistling buoy in 1912 at the east end of the island, and constructed the East Anacapa Island Light between 1930 and 1932. It was the last lighthouse built by the Lighthouse Service on the California coast. The facility was staffed by U.S. Coast Guard six-man crews serving two-year tours of duty from 1939 onwards. The facility included Mission Revival houses, a heavy-lift boom for raising supply boats, three 2,000-US-gallon (1,700 imp gal; 7,600 L) fuel tanks, a 30,000-square-foot (2,800 m^{2}) water catchment basin, and two large redwood water tanks housed in a building. Combined with their families, there were 15 to 25 residents on the island at any given time. Plans were implemented in 1962 to automate the facility and some buildings were demolished, though the houses were spared. The U.S. Coast Guard still owns the property, but the National Park Service moved into the residences in 1970, while sharing the wharf and hoist facilities.

Frenchy's Cove was cleaned up starting in June 1959, and a permanent park ranger replaced the seasonal one in the mid-1970s.

On January 31, 2000, Alaska Airlines Flight 261 crashed near the island following a catastrophic loss of pitch control caused by jackscrew, killing all 88 people aboard.

Along with the Channel Islands Beach area of Port Hueneme, the island is in Census Tract 36.12 of Ventura County, California. The official 2000 census population was three permanent residents, all at the ranger station in the eastern part of East Island.

== Gallery ==
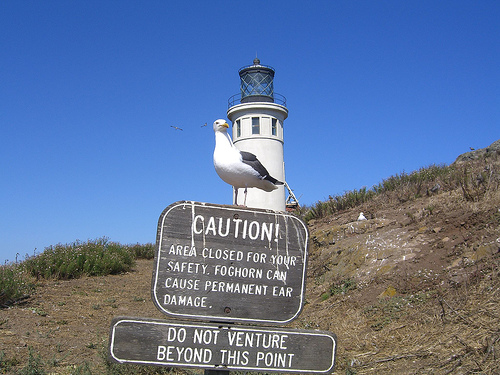
Lighthouse on Anacapa Island

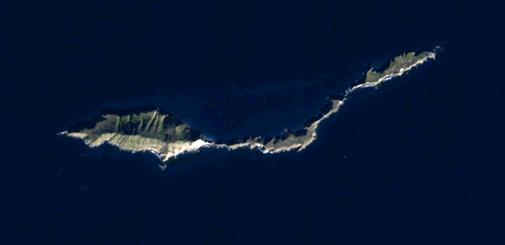
NASA satellite image of Anacapa Island

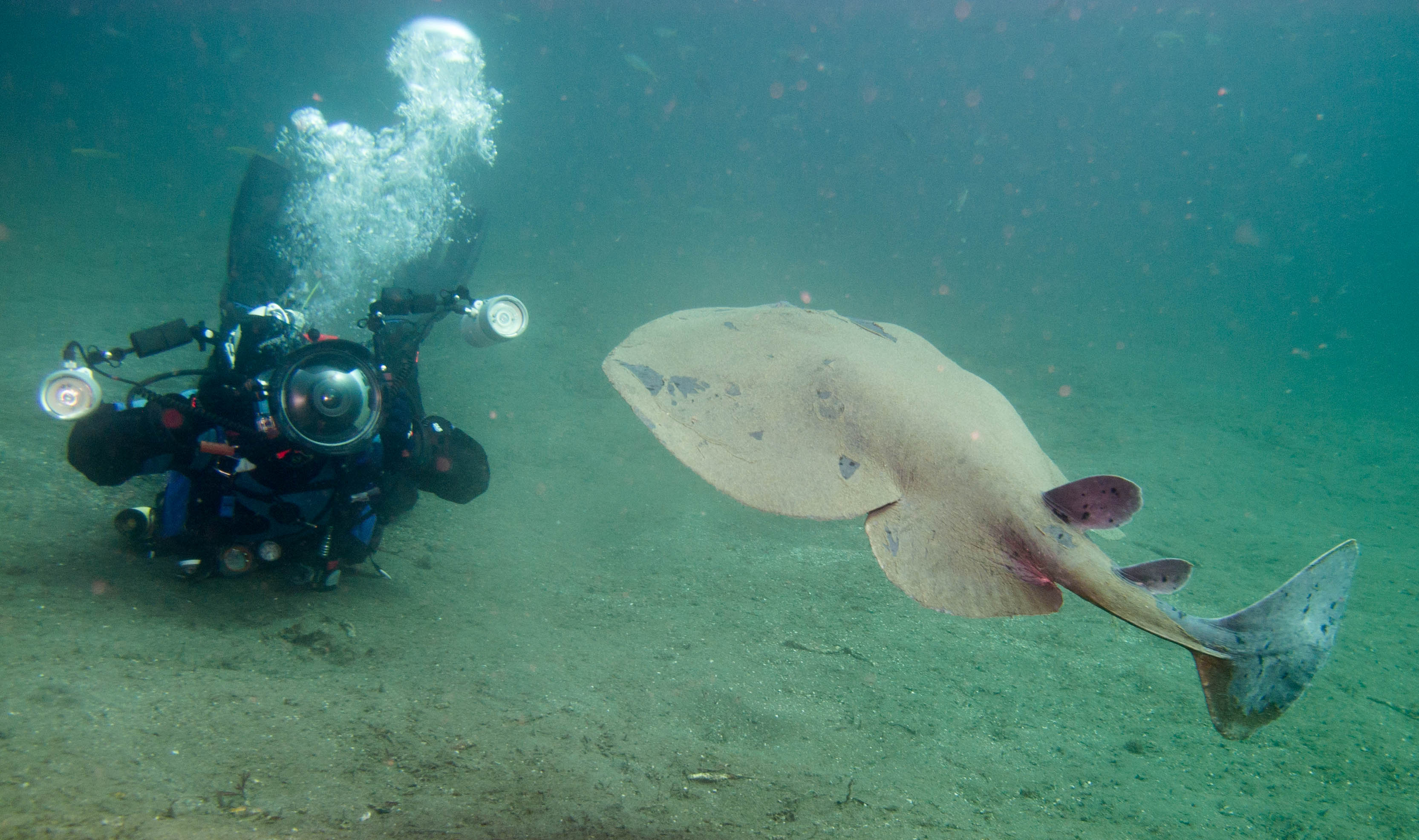
Pacific Electric Ray (torpedo californica) offshore of Anacapa

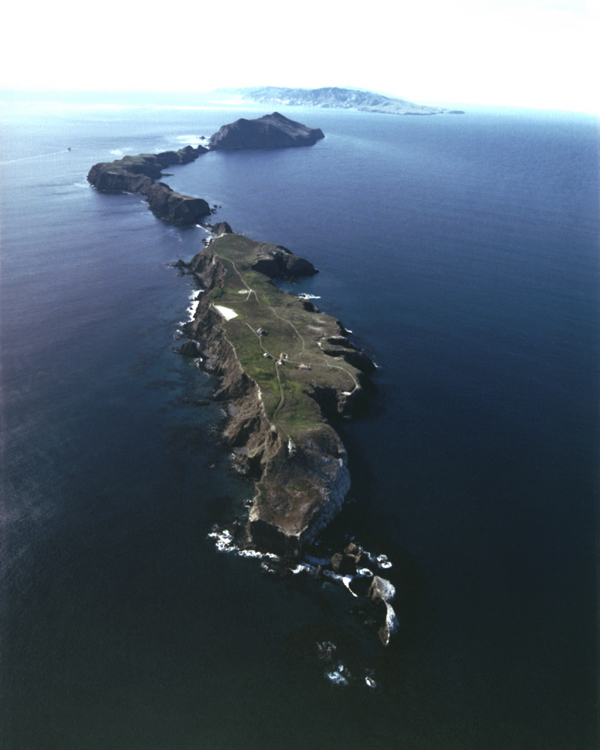
Aerial view of Anacapa with the lighthouse and coastguard station on East Anacapa in the foreground and Middle and West Anacapa behind. Santa Cruz Island is on the horizon.

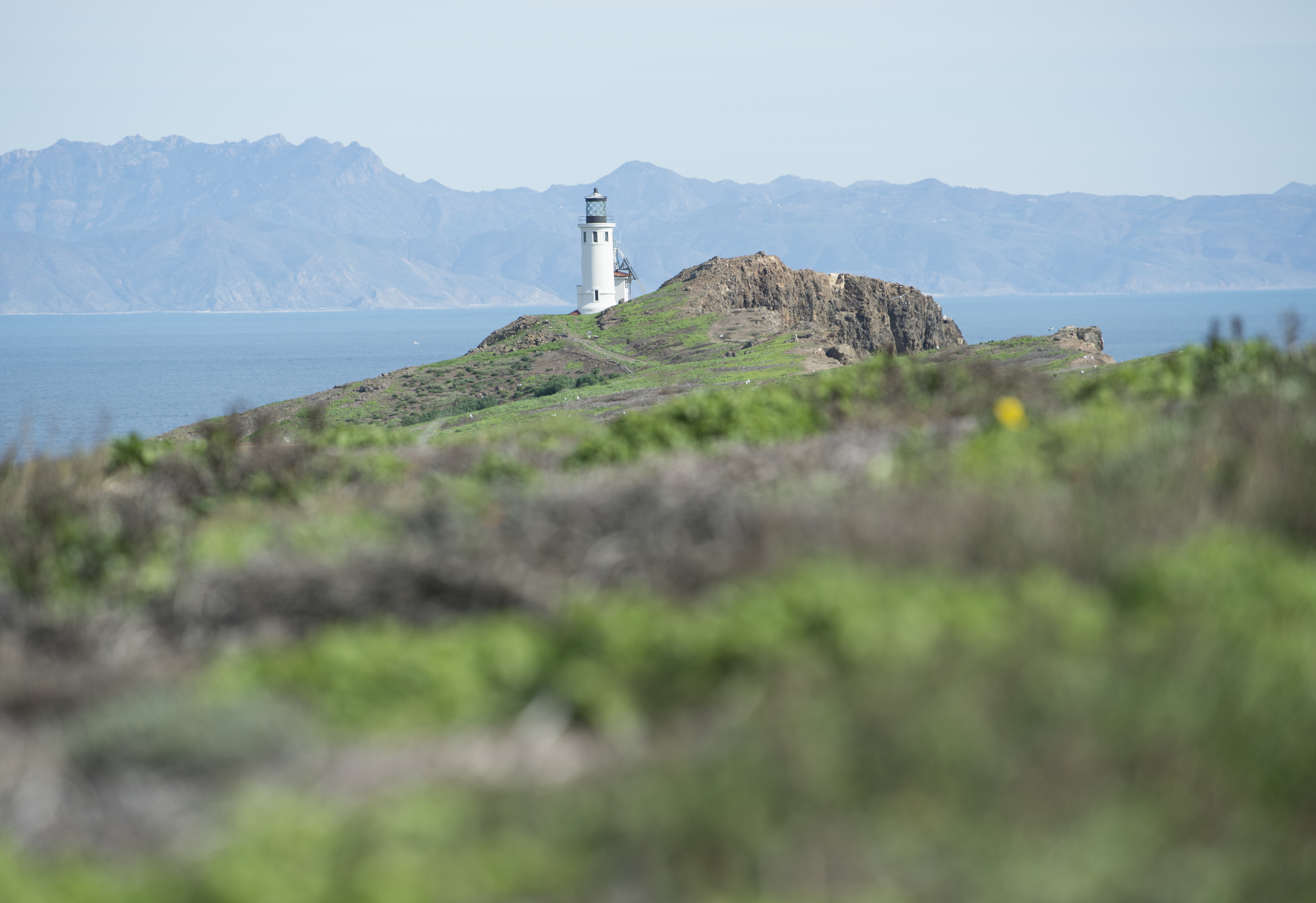
Looking toward mainland California across the Santa Barbara Channel

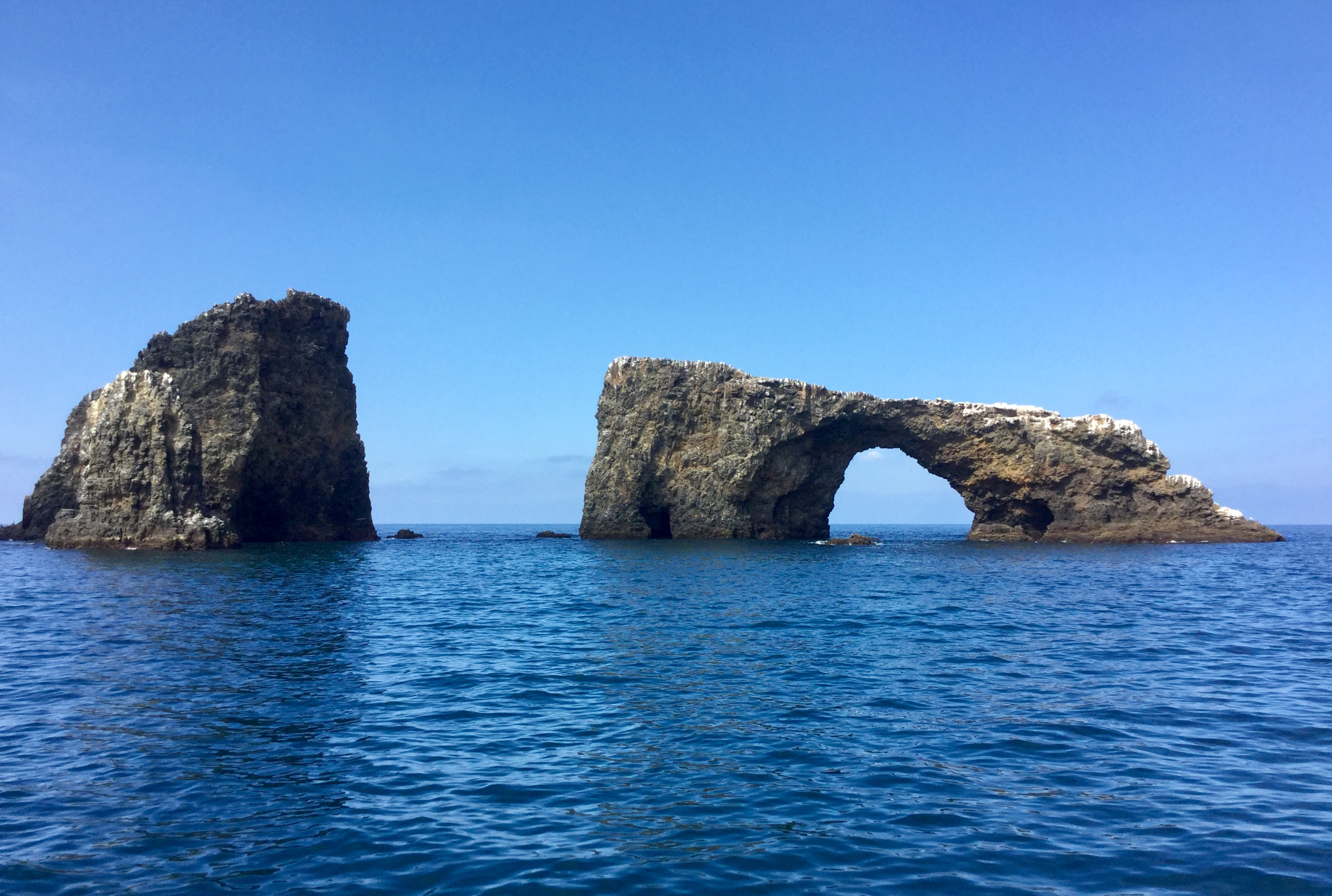
Anacapa Island, Arch Rock

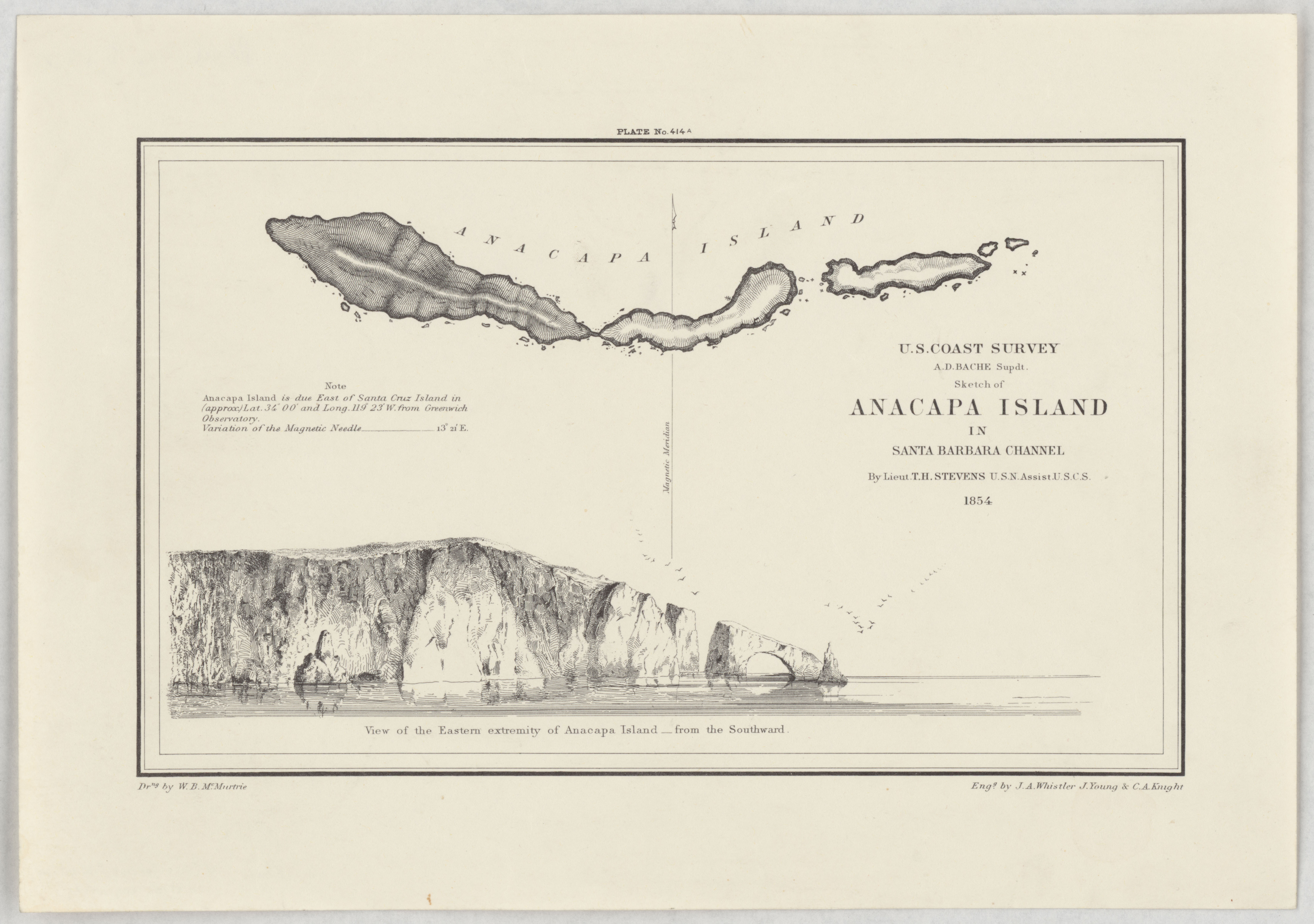
Topography of Anacapa Island in Santa Barbara Channel

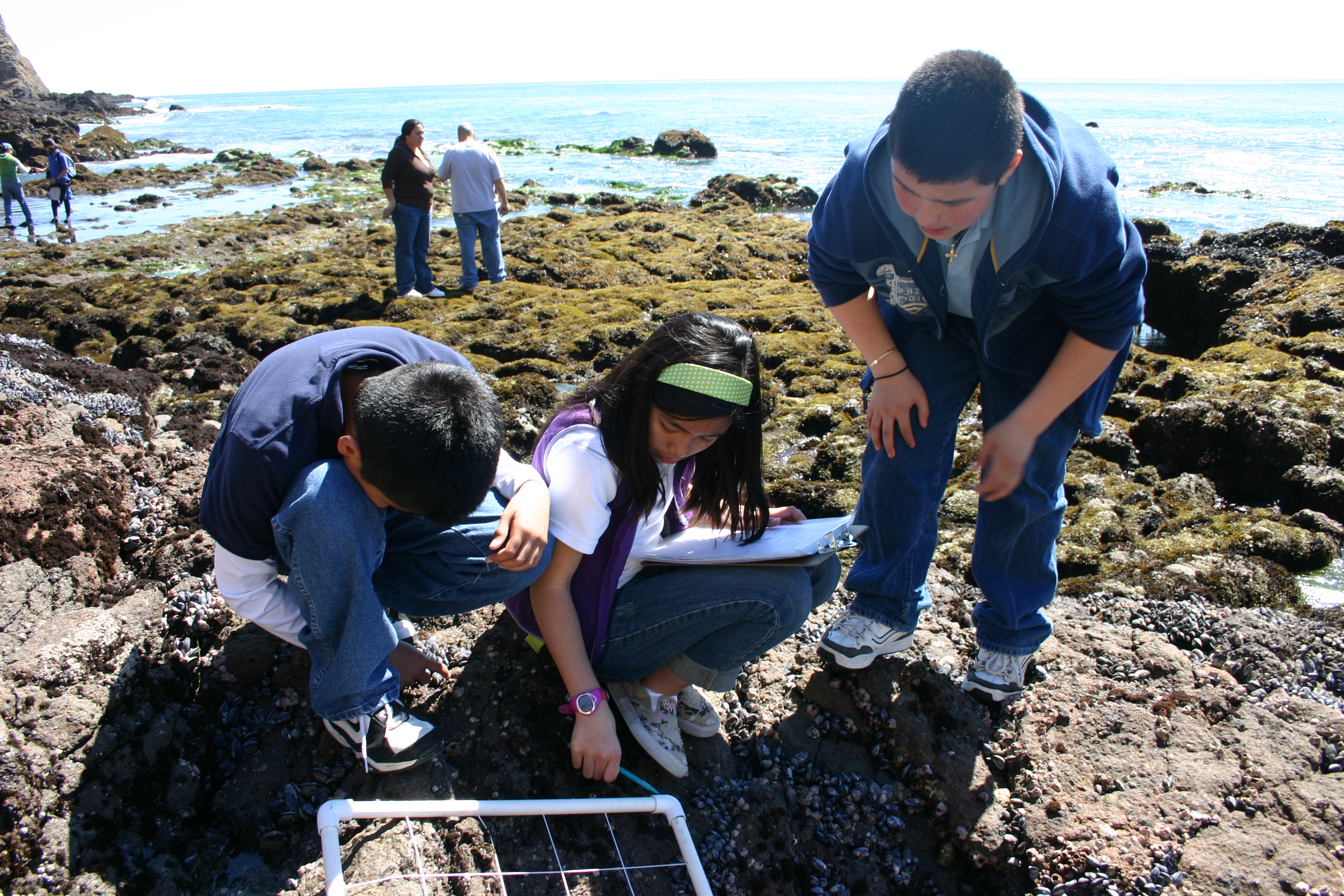
Students at Frenchy's Cove Tidepools, Anacapa Island

== See also ==
- Alaska Airlines Flight 261
- Anacapa Island Archeological District
- Anacapa Island Light
- List of islands of California
- Restoring Balance: Anacapa Island video in the National Park Service page.
- Achieving Balance: Anacapa Island Ten Years Later video in the National Park Service page.

== Sources ==
- Channel Islands National Park: Geologic Formations, National Park Service
- Channel Islands Shipwrecks (PDF), Channel Islands National Marine Sanctuary, NOAA, 2011
- Anacapa Island Restoration Project, California, Island Conservation
- "California Native Plant Society Rare Plant Profiles".
- Banks, Richard C. (August 11, 1966), "Terrestrial Vertebrates of Anacapa Island, California", Transactions of the San Diego Society of Natural History, 14 (14): 173–188, doi:10.5962/bhl.part.19225
- Bunnell, David Edward (1993), Sea Caves of Anacapa Island
- Chawkins, Steve (March 7, 2013), "Anacapa Island thrives after rat eradication", Los Angeles Times
- Collins, P.W. (1979), "Vertebrate zoology: the biology of introduced black rats on Anacapa and San Miguel Islands", in D.M. Power (ed.), Natural Resources Study of the Channel Islands National Monument, California, Santa Barbara, California: Santa Barbara Natural History Museum, pp. 14.1 – 14.56
- Daily, Marla (1973–2015). "Islapedia".
- Davis, W.S. (1997), "The systematics of annual species of Malacothrix (Asteraceae: Lactuceae) endemic to the California Islands", Madroño, 44: 223–244
- Gudde, Erwin; Bright, William (2004). California Place Names (Fourth ed.). University of California Press. p. 12. ISBN 978-0-520-24217-3.
- Howald, Gregg R.; Faulkner, Kate R.; Tershy, Bernie; Keitt, Bradford; Gellerman, Holly; Creel, Eileen M.; Grinnel, Matthew; Ortega, Steven T.; Croll, Donald A. (2005), "Eradication of black rat from Anacapa Island: Environmental and Social Considerations" (PDF), Proceedings of the Sixth California Islands Symposium, Arcata, California: Institute for Wildlife Studies, pp. 299–312
- Howald, Gregg; Donlan, C. Josh; Faulkner, Kate R.; Ortega, Steve; Gellerman, Holly; Croll, Donald A.; Tershy, Bernie (2009), "Eradication of black rats Rattus rattus from Anacapa Island", Oryx, 1 (44): 30–40, doi:10.1017/S003060530999024X
- Holder, Charles Frederick (1910), The Channel islands of California: a book for the angler, sportsman, and tourist, pp. 185–190
- Lamb, Susan; Huey, George H. H. (1998), Channel Islands National Park, Western National Parks Association, ISBN 978-1-877856-74-7
- McCall, Lynne; Perry, Rosalind (2002). California's Chumash Indians : a project of the Santa Barbara Museum of Natural History Education Center (Revised ed.). San Luis Obispo, Calif: EZ Nature Books. ISBN 978-0936784151.
- Owen, Ken (July 17, 2011). "Background on Anacapa Island and the Restoration Project". CIR Anacapa Island Restoration Blog. Channel Islands Restoration.
- Palmer, Donald F. (2004), "Channel Islands National Park", in Harris, Ann G.; Tuttle, Esther; Tuttle, Sherwood D. (eds.), Geology of National Parks, vol. 2 (6 ed.), Kendall Hunt, ISBN 9780787299705
- Roberts, Lois W. (1983), Anacapa Island, McNally & Loftin, West, ISBN 978-0-87461-040-6
