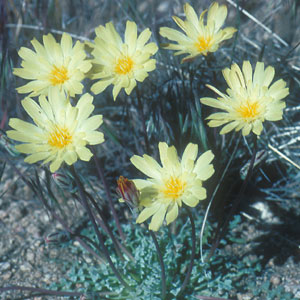

Conservation status
- Secure (NatureServe)

Scientific classification
- Kingdom: Plantae
- Clade: Embryophytes
- Clade: Tracheophytes
- Clade: Angiosperms
- Clade: Eudicots
- Clade: Asterids
- Order: Asterales
- Family: Asteraceae
- Subfamily: Cichorioideae
- Tribe: Cichorieae
- Subtribe: Microseridinae
- Genus: Anisocoma; Torr. & A. Gray
- Species: A. acaulis

Binomial name
- Anisocoma acaulis Torr. & A. Gray

= Anisocoma =

Genus of flowering plants

Anisocoma acaulis, commonly known as the scale bud, is a wildflower found in the Mojave, Colorado Deserts, and California's Owens Valley above 610 metres (2,000 ft) (states of Arizona, Nevada, California, Baja California, and Sonora), up to about 2,130 m (7,000 ft).

It is the only known member of genus Anisocoma.

The plant grows a flat mat of jagged lobed leaves that lie on the ground. It sends up stalks up to 20 centimetres (8 in) tall topped with flowers which bloom from April to June. The flowers may be yellow or white with yellow centers. The frilly ray florets are rectangular with flat or slightly toothed tips. This flower is found growing in colonies in sandy places and washes, and bleeds milky sap if cut. The common name "scale bud" is a reference to the scaly appearance of the closed flower bud.

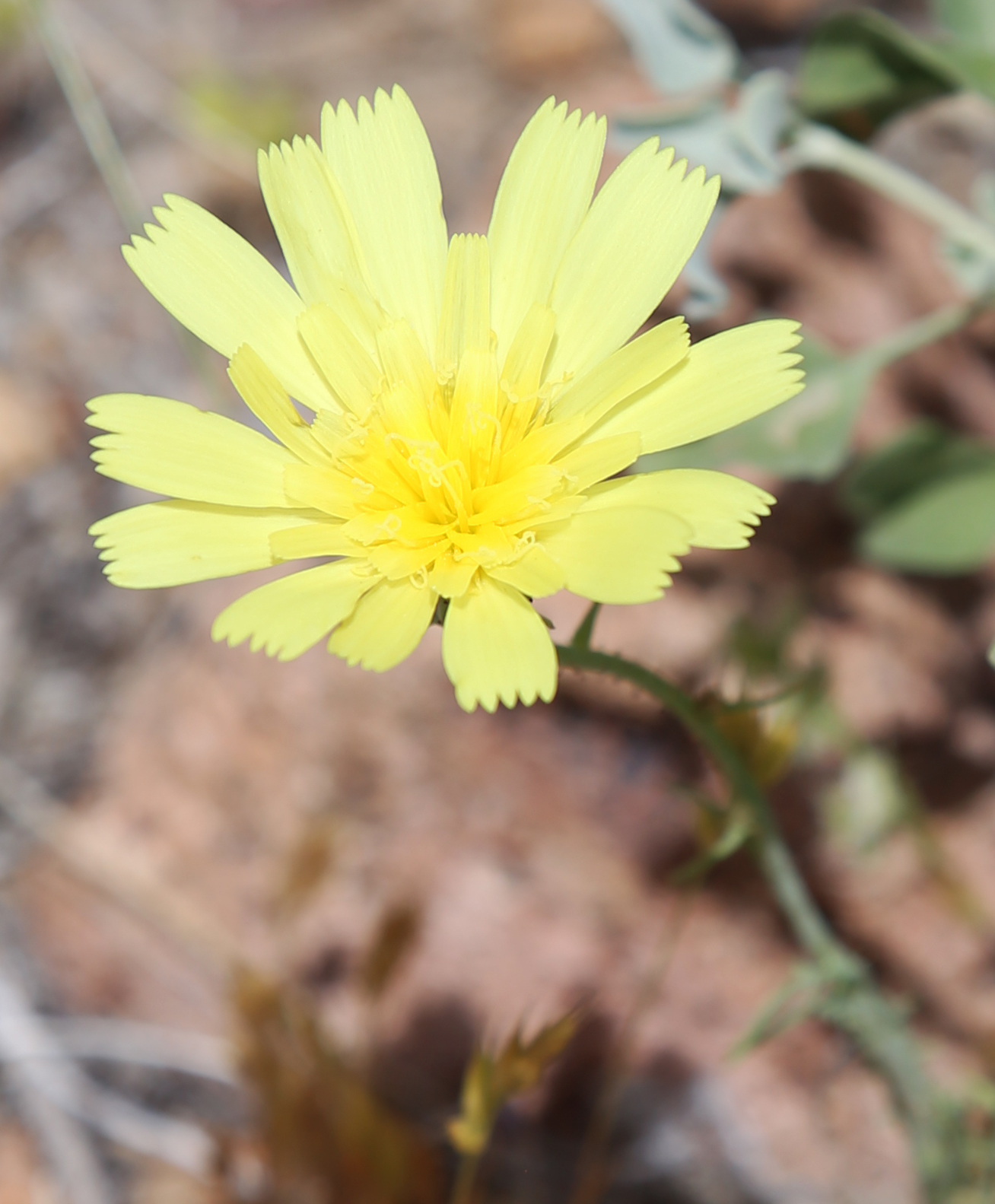
Flower head closeup, at about 1,680 m (5,500 ft) in the Sierra Nevada
