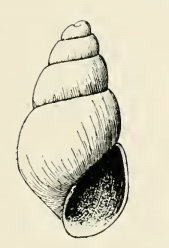
- Apertural view of a shell of Odostomia pratoma

Scientific classification
- Kingdom: Animalia
- Phylum: Mollusca
- Class: Gastropoda
- Family: Pyramidellidae
- Genus: Odostomia
- Species: O. pratoma

Binomial name
- Odostomia pratoma Dall & Bartsch, 1909

Synonyms
- Evalea pratoma (Dall & Bartsch, 1909); Odostomia (Evalea) pratoma Dall & Bartsch, 1909 (basionym)

= Odostomia pratoma =

Species of gastropod

Odostomia pratoma is a species of sea snail, a marine gastropod mollusc in the family Pyramidellidae, the pyrams and their allies.

== Description ==
The bluish-white shell has an elongate-ovate shape. Its length measures 2.9 mm. The whorls of the protoconch are deeply obliquely immersed in the first of the succeeding turns, above which only the tilted edge of the last volution projects. The five whorls of the teleoconch are well rounded, strongly contracted at the sutures, with a rounded sloping shoulder at the summit. The periphery is obsoletely angulated. The base well of the shell is rounded with an obscure umbilical chink. The entire surface of the base and the spire are marked by numerous, slightly retractive lines of growth and exceedingly fine, closely spaced, spiral striations. The aperture is ovate. The posterior angle is obtuse. The outer lip is very thin. The columella is slender, strongly curved, slightly revolute. It is provided with a weak, deep-seated fold at its insertion.

== Distribution ==
The type specimen was found in the Pacific Ocean off Santa Rosa Island, California
