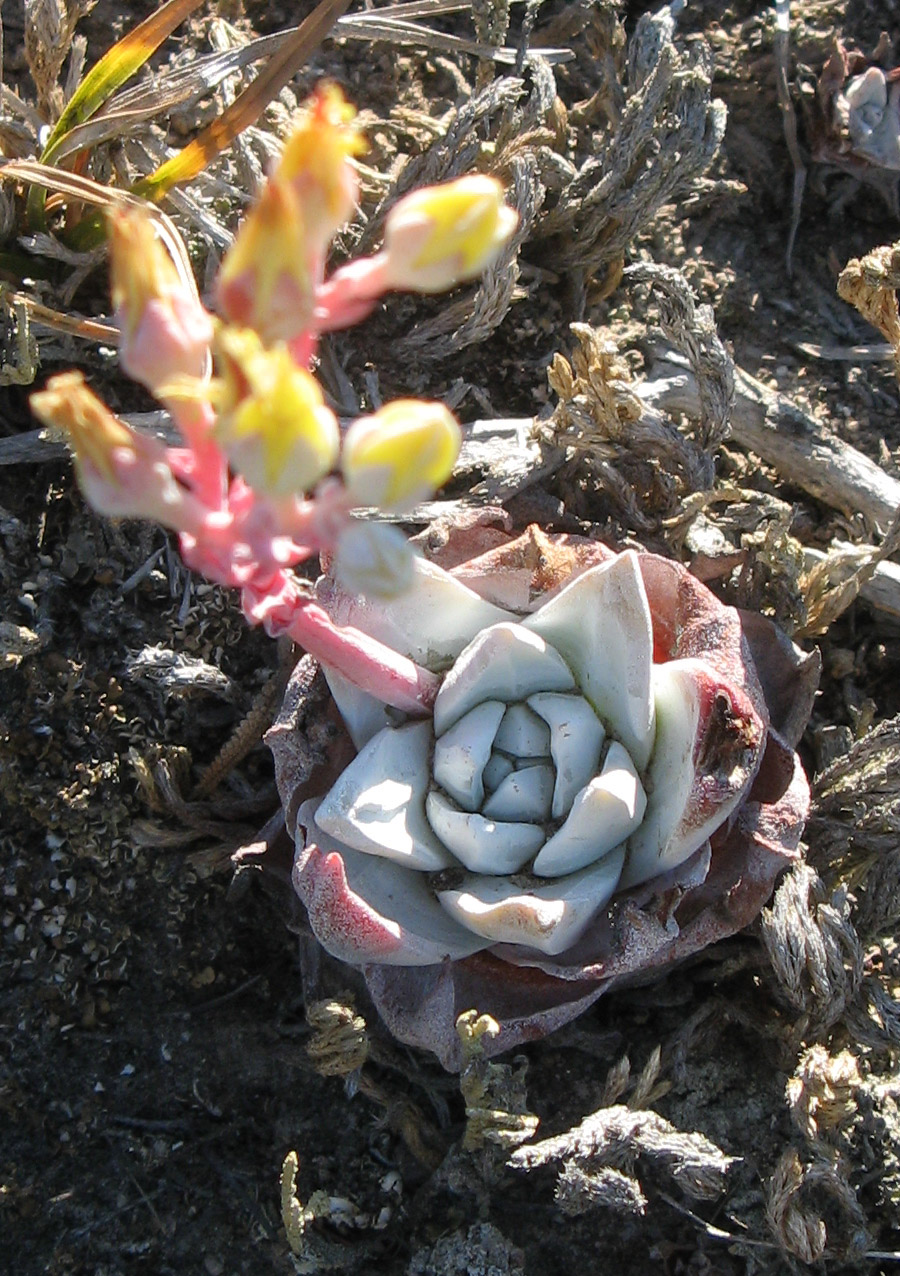

Conservation status
- Critically Imperiled (NatureServe)

Scientific classification
- Kingdom: Plantae
- Clade: Tracheophytes
- Clade: Angiosperms
- Clade: Eudicots
- Order: Saxifragales
- Family: Crassulaceae
- Genus: Dudleya
- Species: D. gnoma

Binomial name
- Dudleya gnoma S.McCabe

Synonyms
- Dudleya greenei forma nana Moran Dudleya nana Moran ex P.H. Thomson

= Dudleya gnoma =

Species of succulent plant

Dudleya gnoma is a rare species of succulent plant in the stonecrop family known by the common names munchkin liveforever and munchkin dudleya. It is characterized by its diminutive stature, small yellow flowers, and distinctive white rosettes. It is endemic to the eastern portion of Santa Rosa Island, one of the Channel Islands of California, where it is known from one population at the type locality, containing three colonies of plants.

== Description ==
This is a compact plant growing from a caudex topped with clumps of rosettes containing up to 20 small leaves. The fleshy triangular leaves are white with a waxy, powdery coating of exudate. The leaves are dry, but not deciduous in summer. The plant produces an inflorescence and studded with small triangular bracts. It bears up to 10 flowers with yellow petals.

=== Morphology ===
Plants may grow up to 10 cm (3.9 in) wide, with 1 to 24 individual rosettes on a plant. The rosettes are usually 0.8–5.1 cm (0.31–2.01 in) wide. The caudex (stem) is 1.2–2 cm (0.47–0.79 in) wide. The leaves are 0.5–1.3 cm (0.20–0.51 in) long by 0.6–2.5 cm (0.24–0.98 in) wide, shaped triangular to triangular-ovate.

The peduncle is 2.5–13 cm (0.98–5.12 in) tall by 2–5 mm (0.079–0.197 in) wide. The inflorescence may branch up to 2 times. The terminal branches have 1 to 10 flowers on them. The flowers are suspended on pedicels 1–3 mm (0.039–0.118 in) long. The flowers have sepals 3.5–4 mm (0.14–0.16 in) long, 2–3 mm (0.079–0.118 in) wide. The petals are 8–9 mm (0.31–0.35 in) long, 3 mm (0.12 in) wide, and are fused in the lower 1–2 mm (0.039–0.079 in). The keels of the petals may be more or less glaucous.

Plants flower from May through June. Chromosome number is 2n = 68.

== Taxonomy ==
=== Taxonomic history ===
The population was discovered in the 1950s and assumed to be a form of Dudleya greenei, a plant also occurring on the island which is similar but larger and contains the same number of chromosomes. Reid Moran regarded it as Dudleya greenei forma nana in an unpublished description. In the publication of the Dudleya and Hasseanthus Handbook, Paul H. Thomson separated the plant as a distinct species, Dudleya nana (1988), based on Moran's description and the cultivated "White Sprite" variety. However, Thomson's description was not valid. He failed to accurately place the collection number, collector, collection date, type specimen, or the location of a type specimen in a herbarium, which meant that Thompson's description did not constitute a valid publication according to the International Code of Botanical Nomenclature.

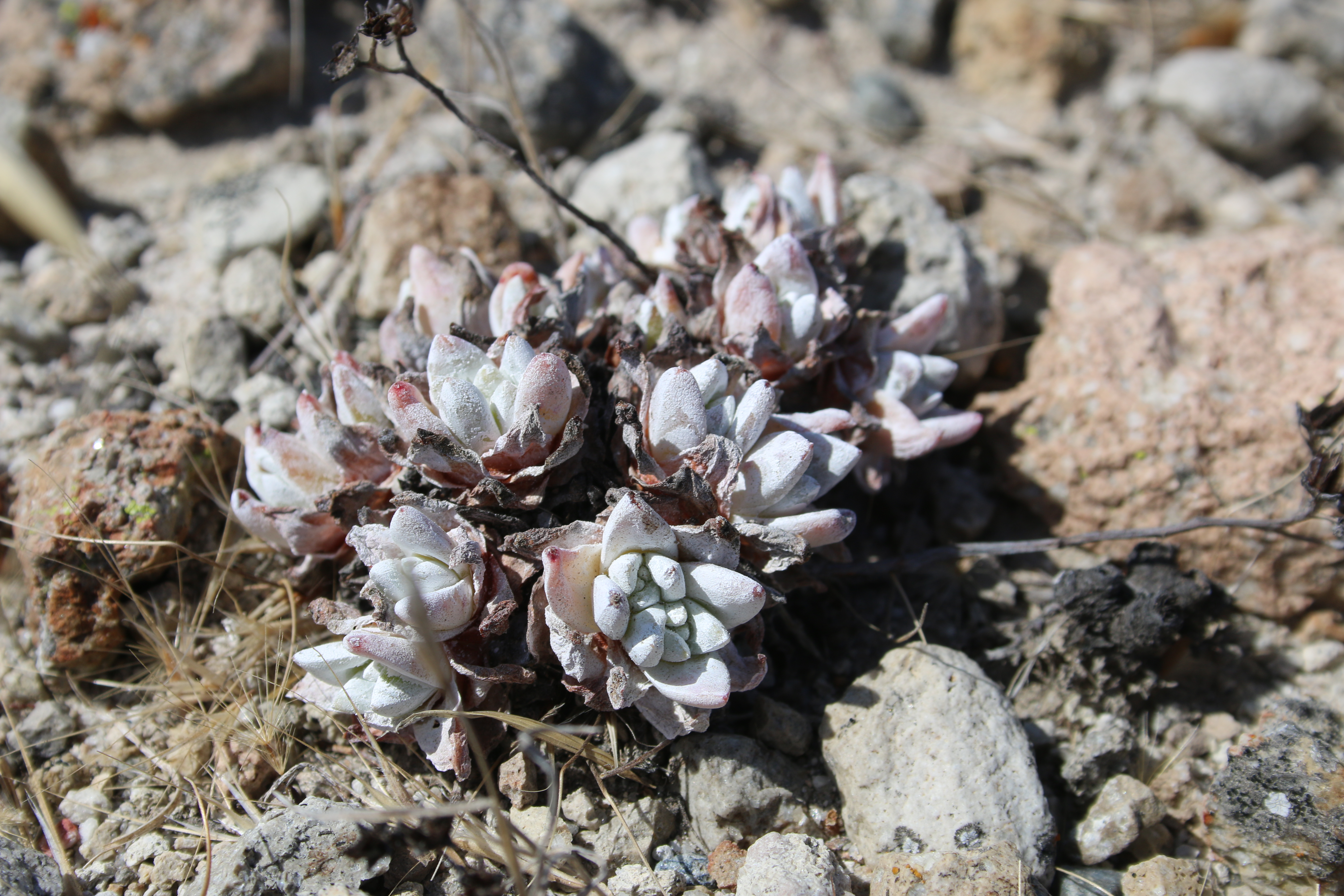
Growing in the shallow Miocene volcanic substrate on Santa Rosa.

In 1997, botanist Stephen W. McCabe gave the species a proper description as Dudleya gnoma. The species was placed in the subgenera Dudleya. Although it is included in subgenus Dudleya, some of the petals approach a degree of spreading seen mostly in subgenus Stylophyllum plants like Dudleya traskiae. The habit of the plants to grow on flat areas and in shallow soil is also similar to the subgenus Hasseanthus. The overwhelming majority of the other characteristics, including the average petal altitude, broad leaf bases, and evergreen nature, does place it in subgenus Dudleya.

=== Characteristics ===
This plant differs from Dudleya greenei, which it was originally assigned to, in a number of different ways. The rosettes of D. gnoma are much smaller, and the leaves are shaped triangular to triangular-ovate, as opposed to the larger, non-triangular and variously shaped leaves of D. greenei. The bracts, flowers, and pedicels of D. gnoma are all smaller and shorter than in D. greenei.

In D. gnoma, the base of the pedicel of the first flower is 2 to 4 mm from the base of the lowest cincinnus. In D. greenei, the base of the pedicel of the first flower is usually 0 mm from the base of the first cincinnus, as it is directly attached to it. In D. gnoma, there are usually two branches to the inflorescence, and the two infrequently rebranch after. In D. greenei, there are usually three branches in the inflorescence, and they may rebranch and ascend.

In horticultural or lush, rainy conditions, D. gnoma may produce additional branches on the inflorescence. The habitat of both species is also different. D. gnoma is found on shallow soils in flat areas, while D. greenei is found on cliff faces in canyons or seacliffs. Even the smallest flowering forms of Dudleya greenei are distinguished from D. gnoma, because they have blunter leaf apices and leaves that are oblong and more round in cross section.

== Distribution and habitat ==
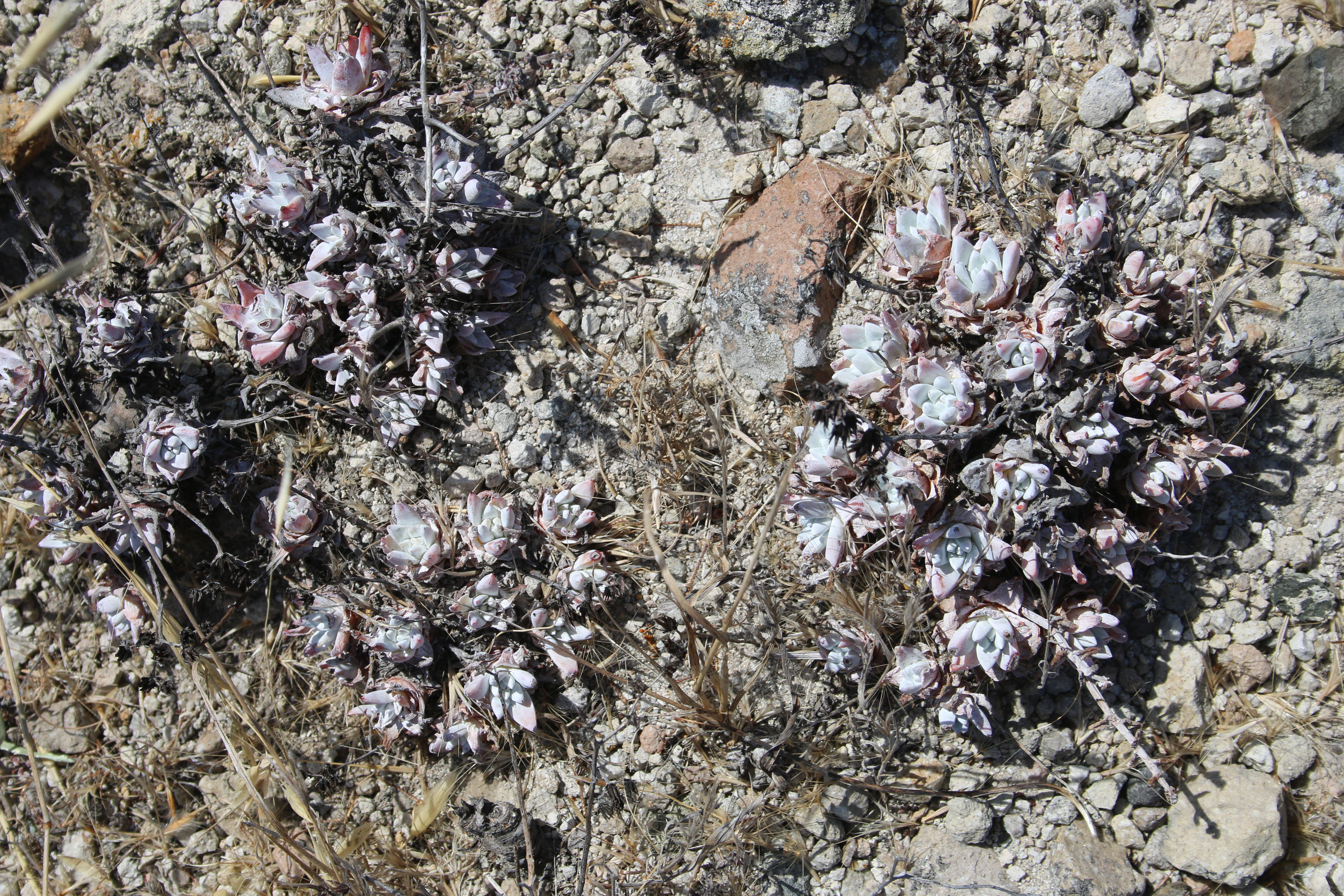
Population in habitat.

This species is distributed on Santa Rosa Island, one of the Channel Islands of California in the United States. It is found on a ridge on the eastern side of the island. This species grows on rocky slopes with shallow volcanic soils.

The population was impacted by grazing from non-native mammals introduced by ranchers in the nineteenth and twentieth centuries. By 2011, all deer, elk, and cattle were removed from the island. This species still faces threats from a limited gene pool and the fact that a single severe event such as a drought, could eliminate the single population. It also faces the potential threat of plant poachers.

== Horticulture ==
Though rare in the wild, this dudleya is kept in cultivation by gardeners and enthusiasts of succulents, and a cultivar called 'White Sprite' is popular. The cultivar was first introduced and named by Abbey Garden in the early 1970s from a plant of Dorothy Dunn, who in turn acquired her material from Reid Moran. The International Succulent Institute also distributed one of Moran's specimens, Moran 3364, as 'White Sprite' in 1977.

Although the plant is available in cultivation, the species is more difficult to maintain than other Dudleya species. Supplemental watering in summer may damage or even kill the roots, and leads to often little or stunted growth.

Dudleya gnoma in cultivation

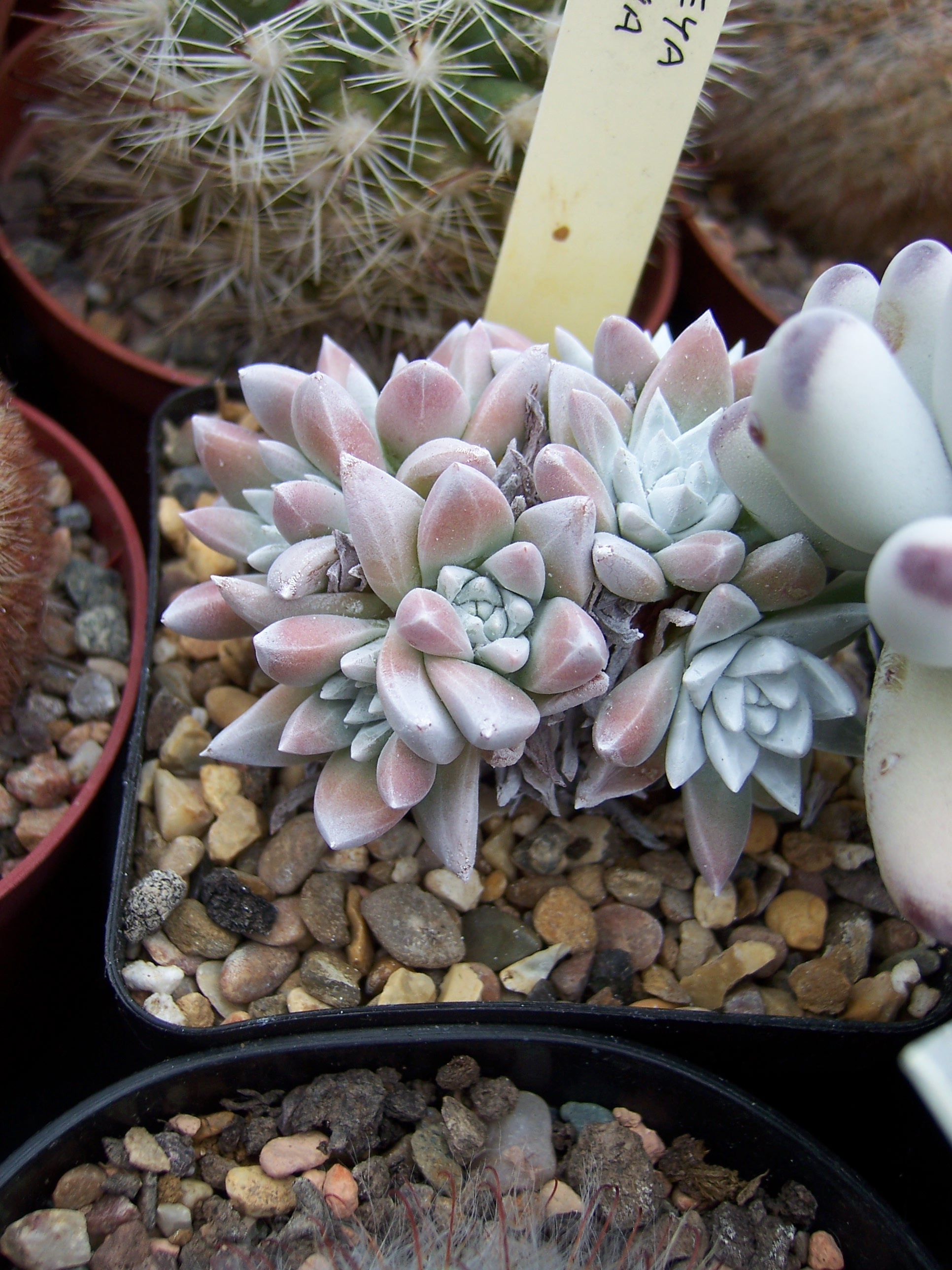
In cultivation.

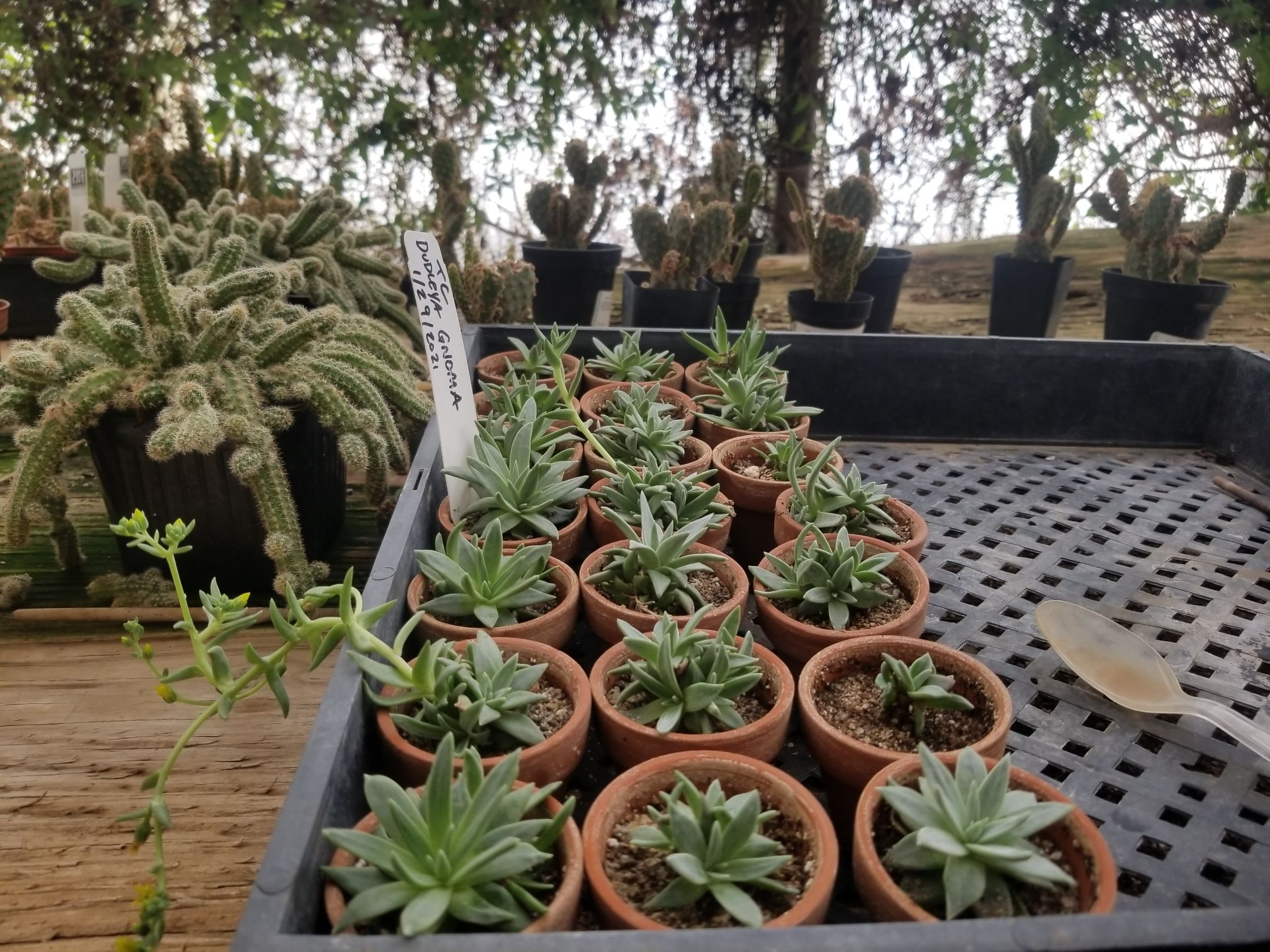
The straight species of Dudleya gnoma produced from tissue culture at Tree of Life Nursery.

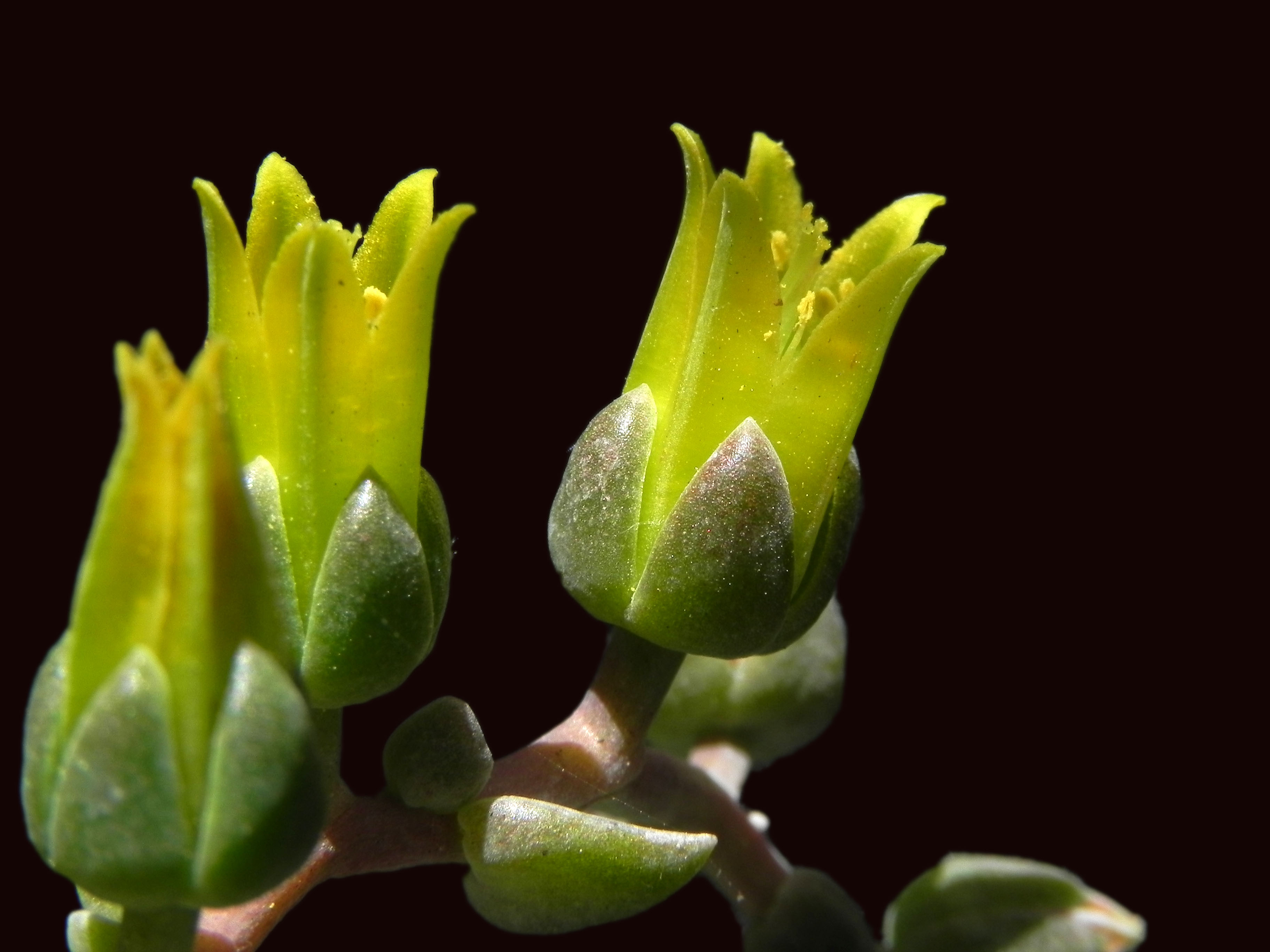
Detail of the flowers, from a tissue culture plant.

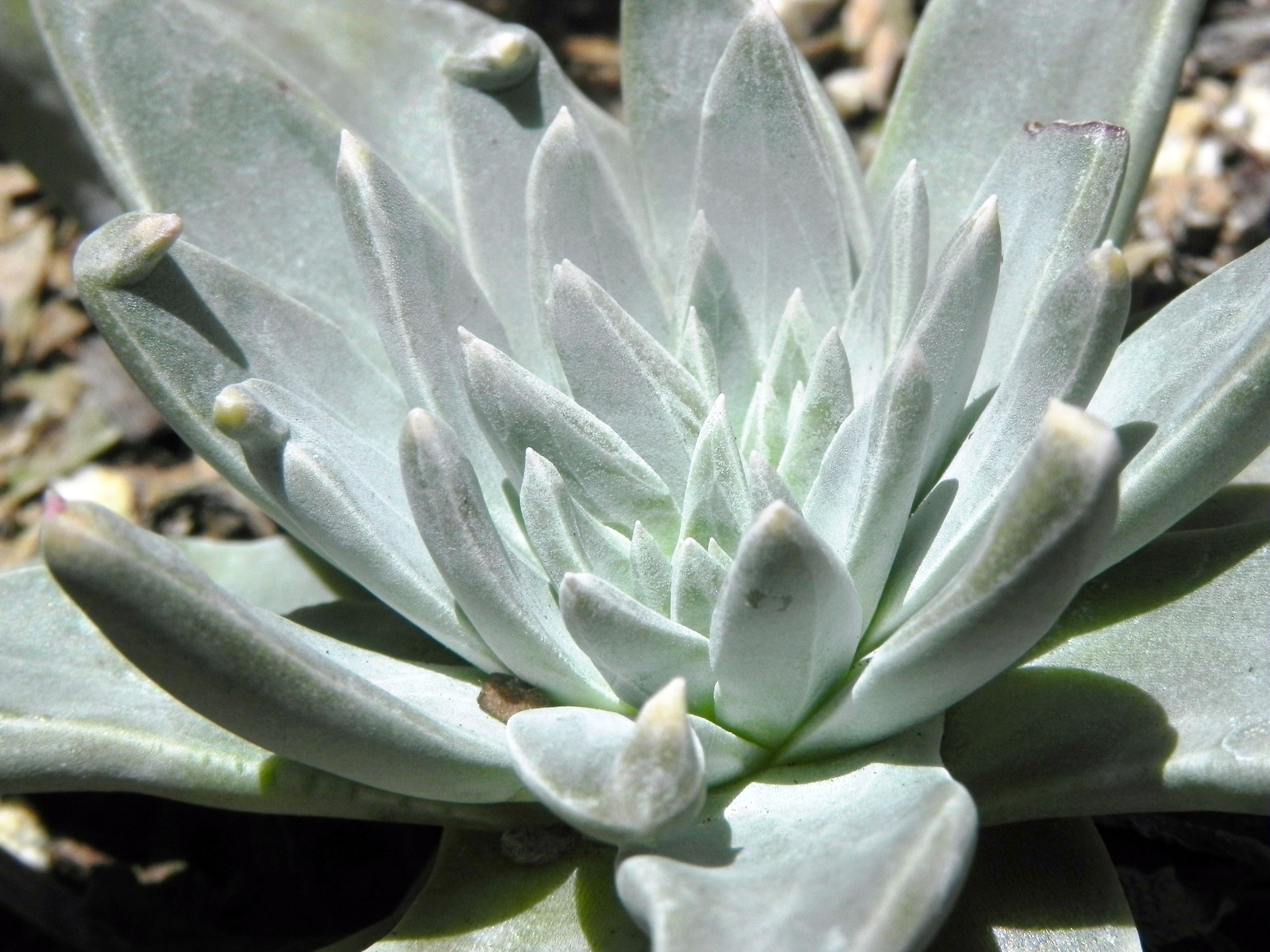
The rosette of a tissue culture plant, which is larger compared to the commonly available 'White Sprite' cultivar.

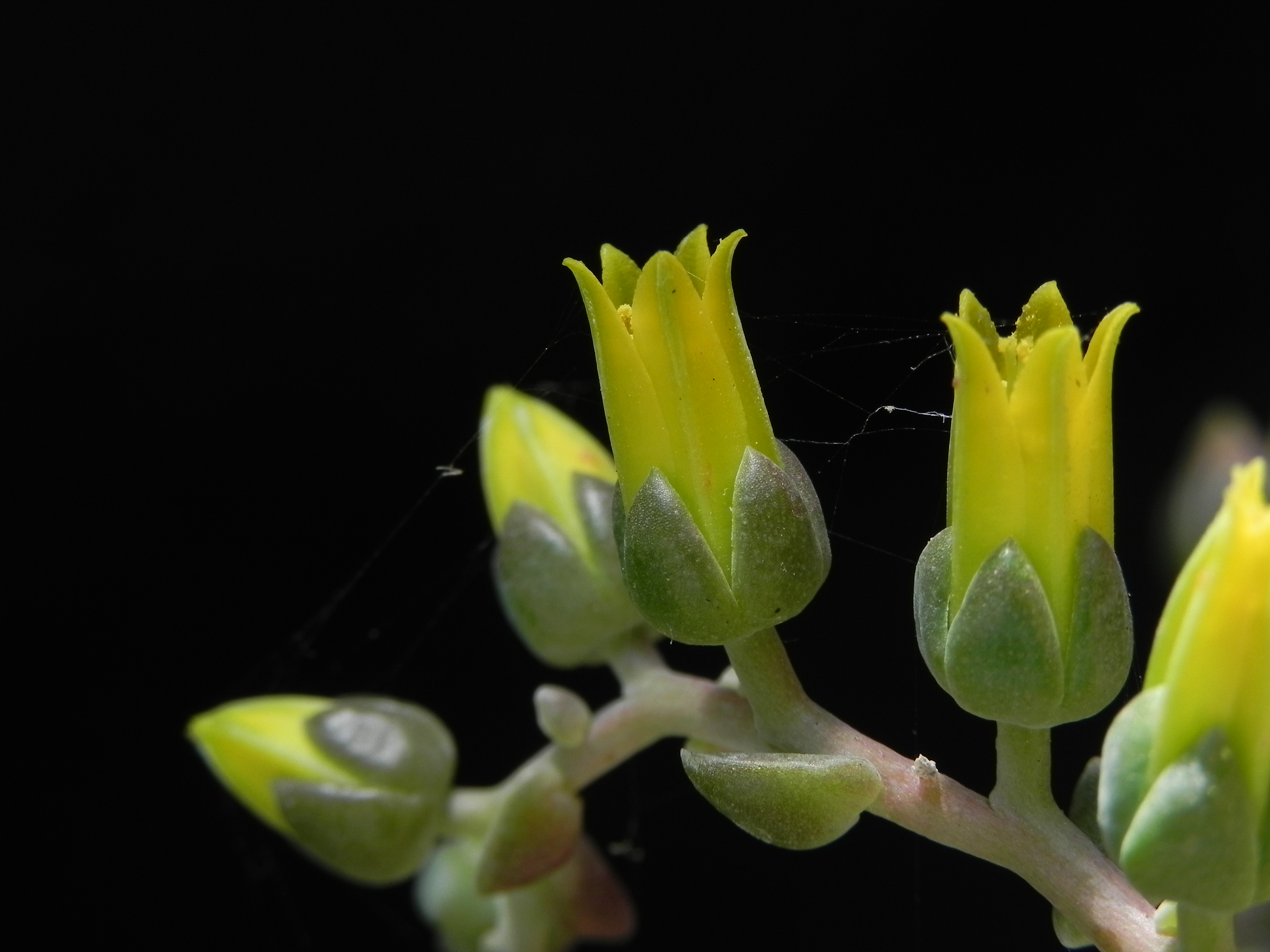
The flowers.
