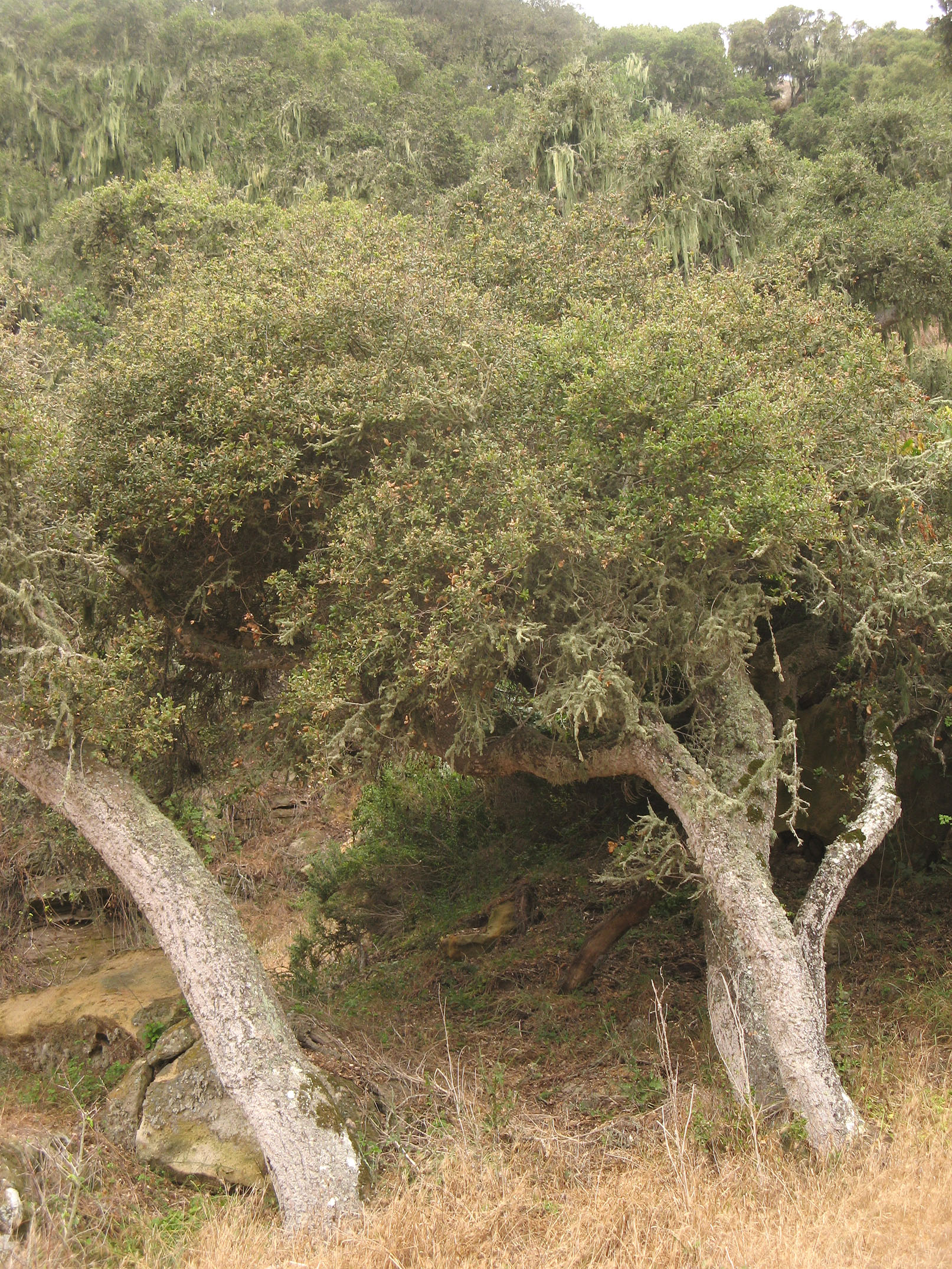
- island oak, Santa Rosa Island

Conservation status
- Endangered (IUCN 3.1)

Scientific classification
- Kingdom: Plantae
- Clade: Tracheophytes
- Clade: Angiosperms
- Clade: Eudicots
- Clade: Rosids
- Order: Fagales
- Family: Fagaceae
- Genus: Quercus
- Subgenus: Quercus subg. Quercus
- Section: Quercus sect. Protobalanus
- Species: Q. tomentella

Binomial name
- Quercus tomentella Engelm.
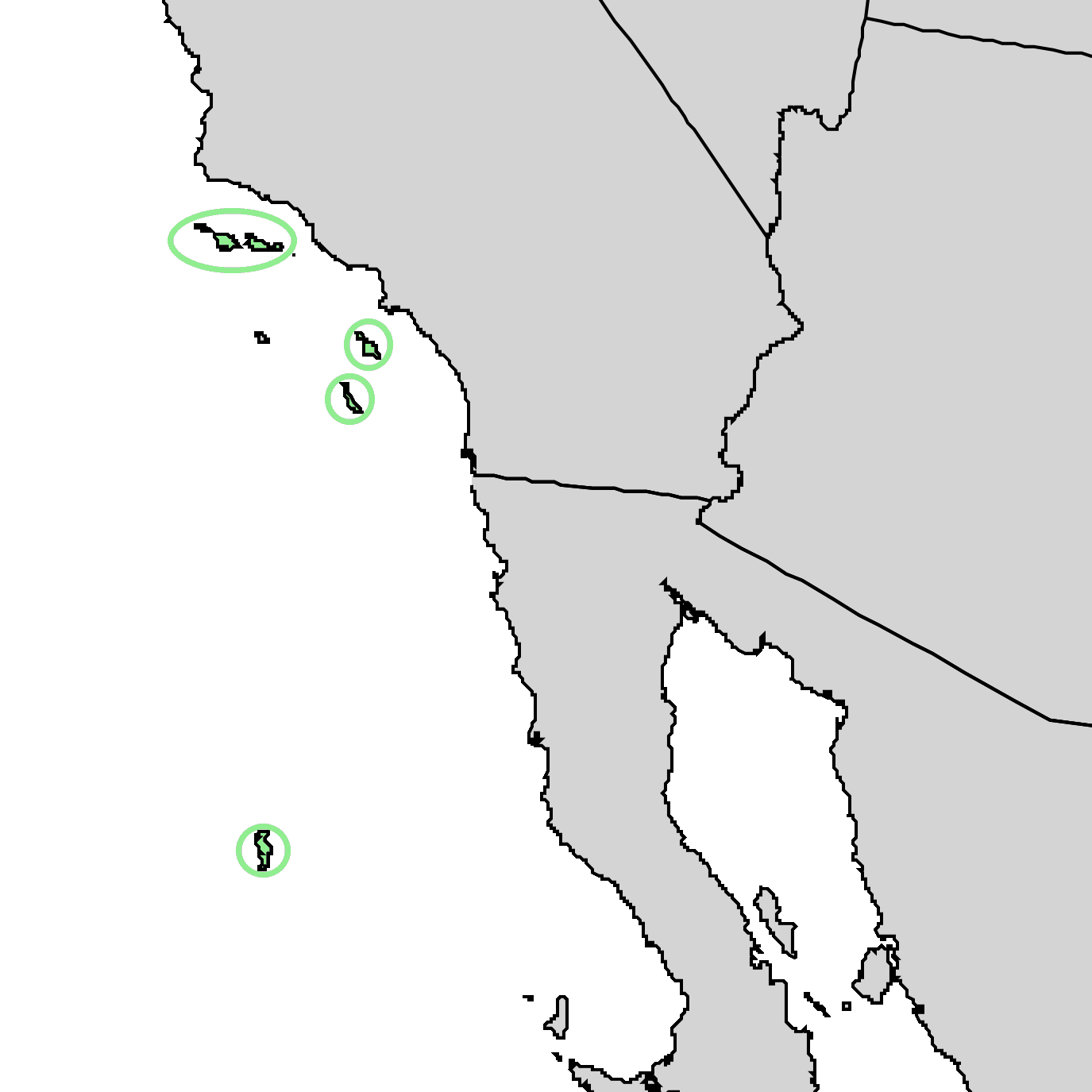
- Natural range of Quercus tomentella

Synonyms
- List: Quercus chrysolepis subsp. tomentella (Engelm.) A.E.Murray; Quercus chrysolepis var. tomentella (Engelm.) A.E.Murray; Quercus tomentella var. conjungens Trel.; Quercus tomentella f. conjungens (Trel.) Trel.

= Quercus tomentella =

Species of tree

Quercus tomentella, the island oak, island live oak, or Channel Island oak, is an oak in the section Protobalanus. It is native to six islands: five of the Channel Islands of California and Guadalupe Island, part of Baja California.

It is placed in Quercus section Protobalanus.

== Description ==
Quercus tomentella is an evergreen tree growing up to 20 metres (66 feet) in height, with spreading branches forming a rounded crown. However, the growth habit is variable, with some trees developing narrower crowns, and other becoming wider than they are tall The mature bark is grayish to reddish brown, scaly and furrowed The twigs are reddish and covered in woolly hairs.

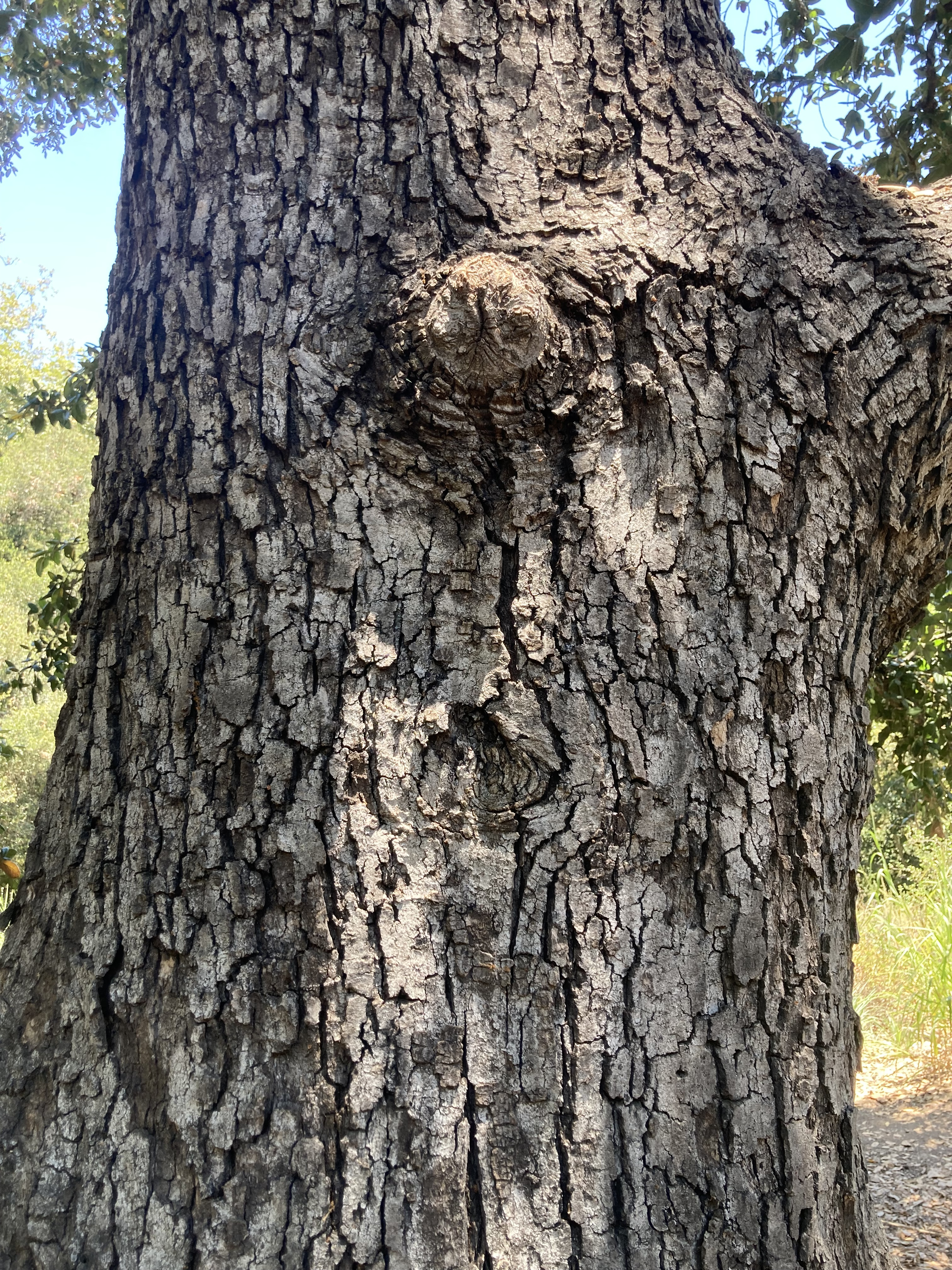
Scaly, deeply furrowed bark of an older tree

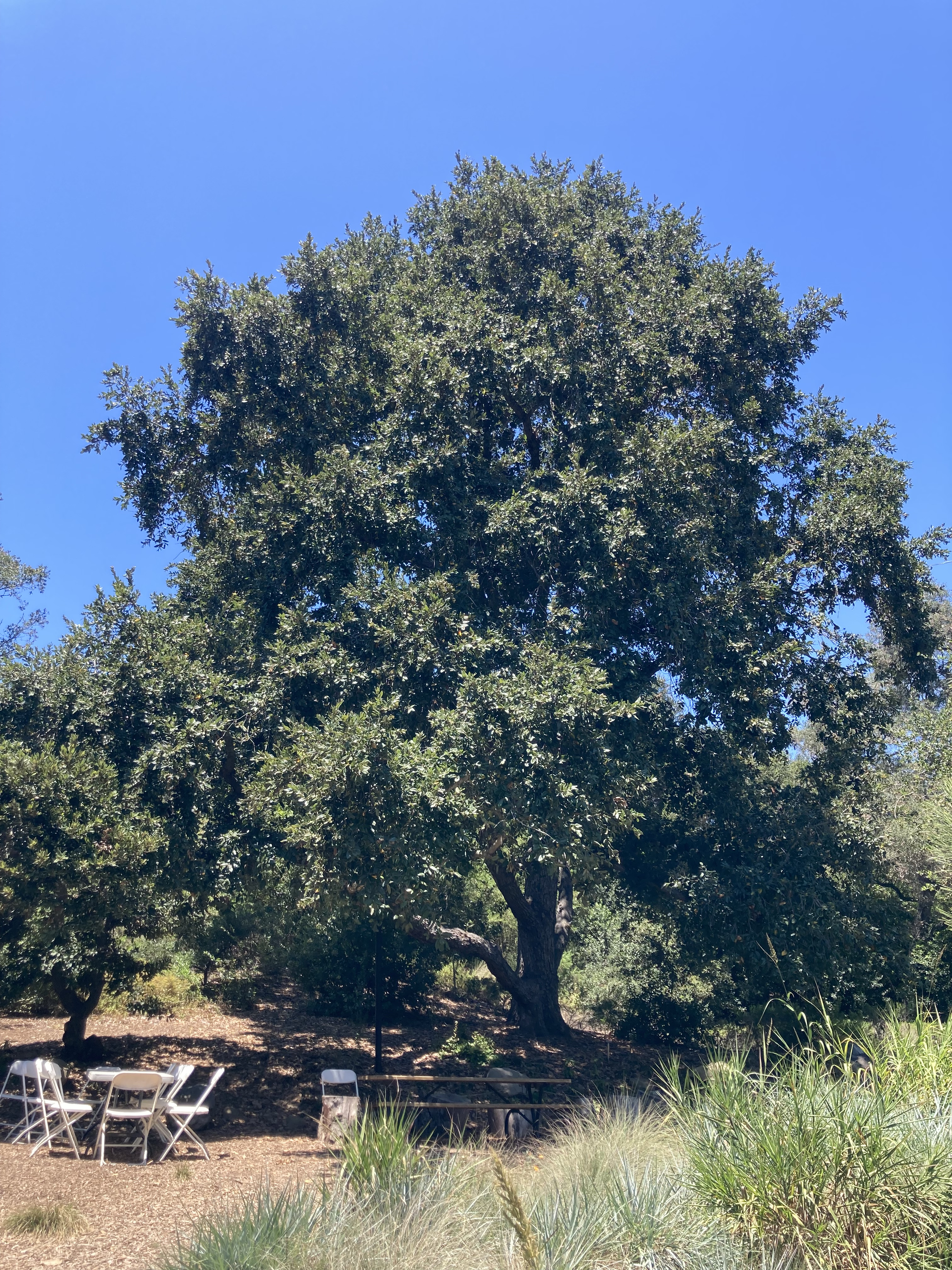
Mature cultivated specimen at Santa Barbara Botanic Garden

The leaves are usually 5-8cm long, with petioles 5-18mm long. The leaf edges are variable: they can be smooth, scalloped or toothed. The leaves have dark glossy green upper surfaces and gray-green, matte undersides coated in wooly hairs, losing them over time. The leathery leaf blades are usually strongly revolute and are an oblong to oblong ovate in shape. The leaves have pinnate lateral veins which are straight and nearly parallel. The veins impressed on the upper surface and raised on the underside.

The acorn grows singly or in pairs. The cup has thick scales and woolly hairs and is up to 3 cm (1 1/8 in) wide. The acorn takes two years to reach maturity on the tree, a trait other members of Protobalanus share The nut is up to 3.5 cm with a rounded tip.

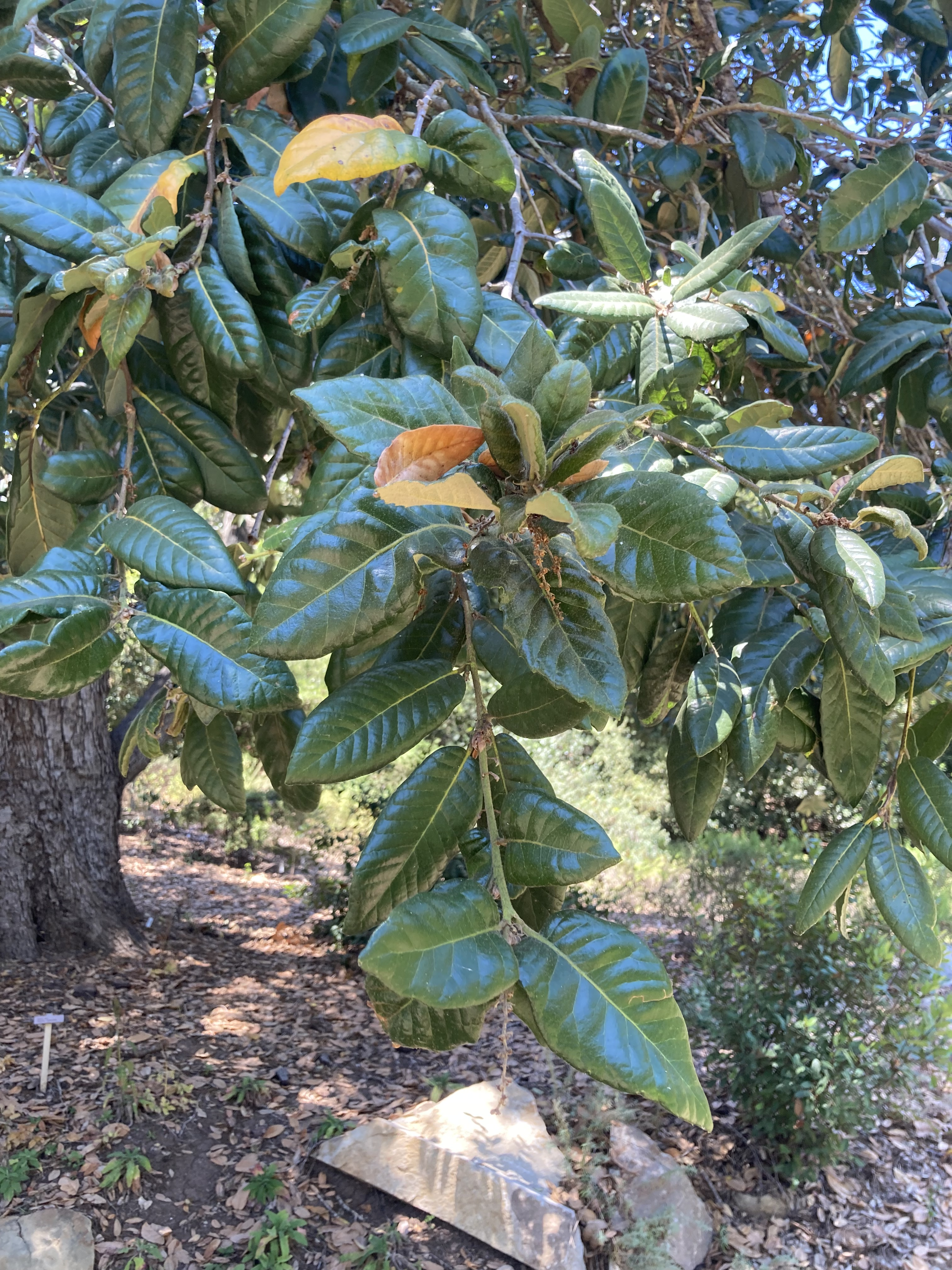
Dark, glossy leaf surfaces

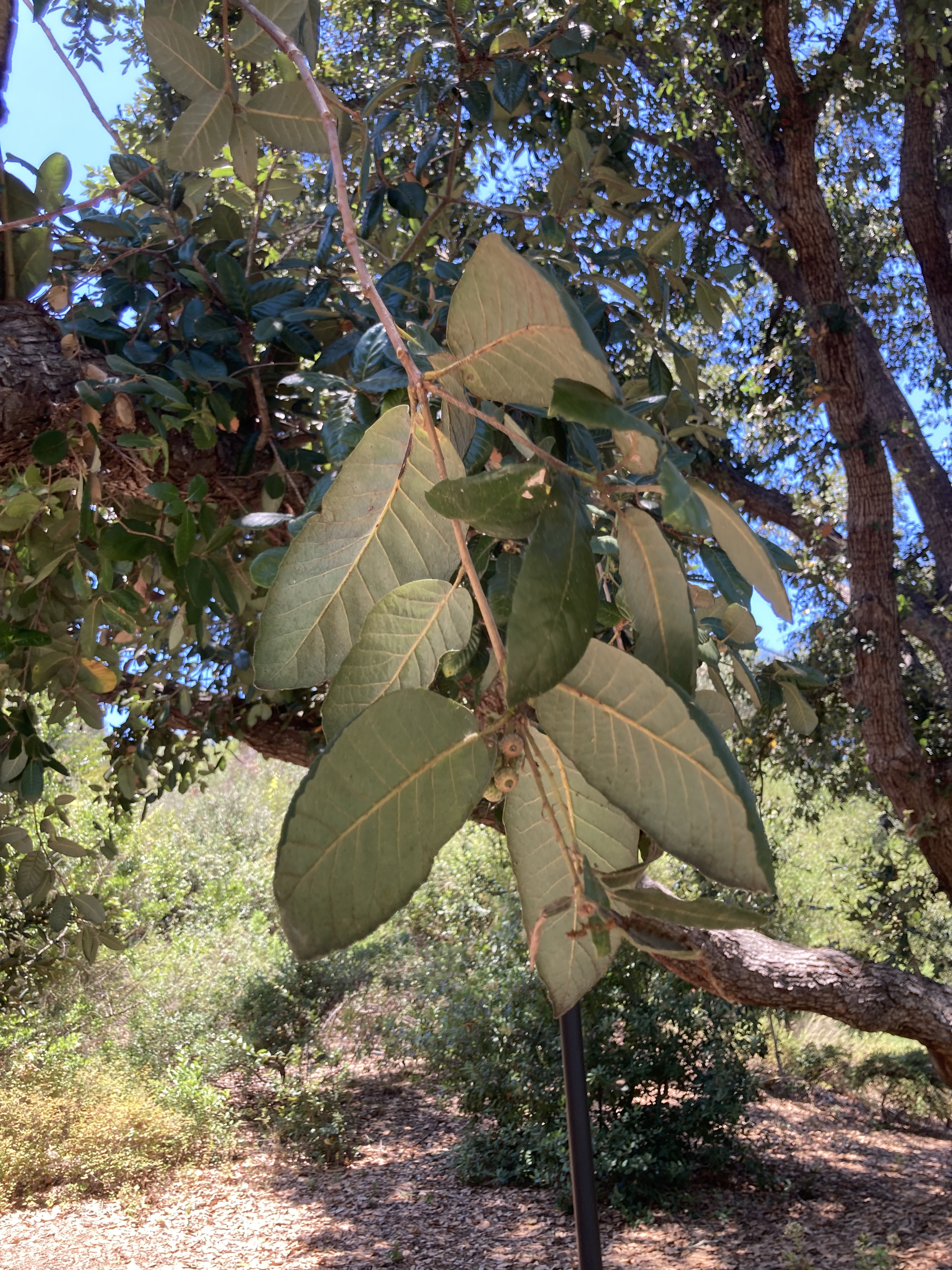
Pale, tomentose leaf undersides, whence the scientific name

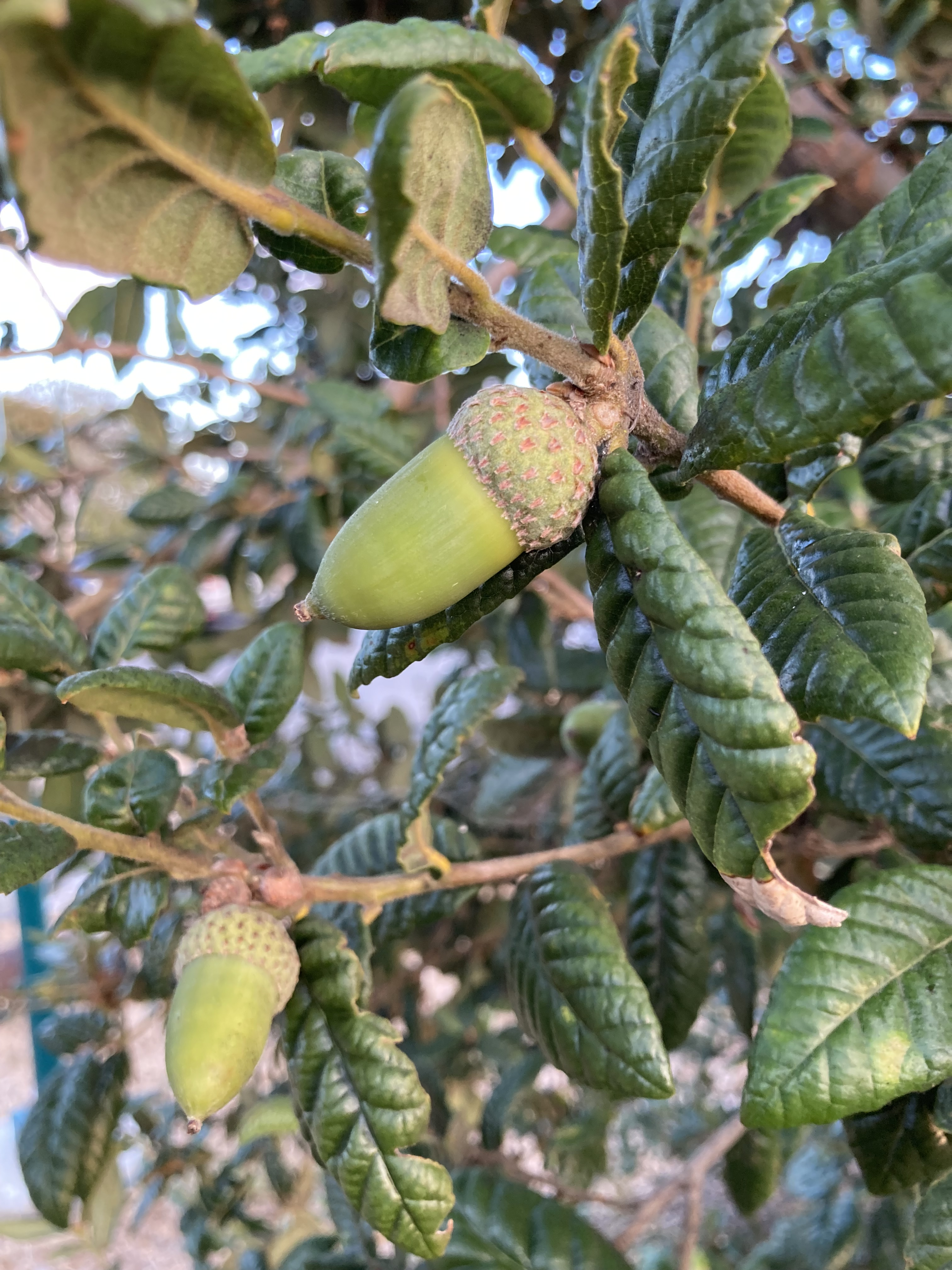
Developing acorn and cupule

== Distribution and habitat ==
It is native to six islands: five of the Channel Islands of California (Anacapa Island, San Clemente Island, Santa Catalina Island, Santa Cruz Island, and Santa Rosa Island) and Guadalupe Island, part of the State of Baja California.

This species is a relict. Though it is now limited to the islands, it was once widespread in mainland California, as evidenced by the many late Tertiary fossils of the species found there. Recently, it was found that there was a high genetic variability across many of the Q. tomentella populations, but this variation was not evenly distributed. On exposed, windy sites, island oaks often exhibit contorted, asymmetrical growing habits, shaped by the persistent oceanic winds.

== Ecology ==
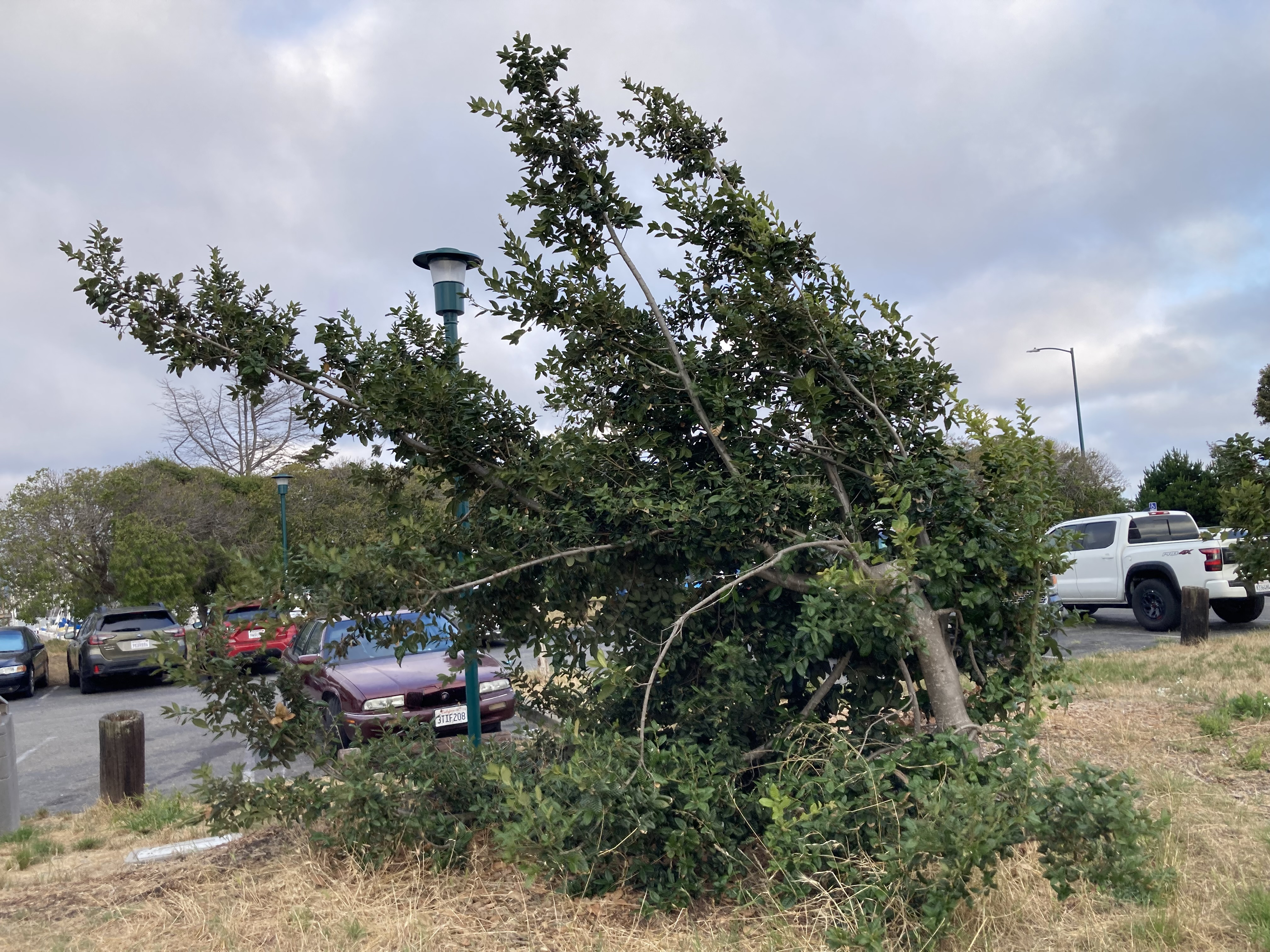
Wind-battered specimen in Emeryville Marina Park

The island oak plays an important role in the ecosystems of the Channels Islands. This species forms small woodlands and groves on ridges as well as ravines, north-facing slopes and narrow valleys on the islands it is native to. When a marine layer occurs in the Channel Islands, the foliage intercepts the fog which condenses on the leaves and drips into the soil. The dense tomentum of Q. tomentella increases the leaf's surface area and ability to harvest moisture from the fog, this fog capture can increase soil moisture substantially. Leaf litter can build up beneath Q. tomentella groves, combined with the fog drip creates a favorable germination substrate for other plant species on the islands, with island oaks acting as "nurse plants".

Island oak can hybridize with canyon live oak (Quercus chrysolepis), but the genetic story is complex. Genomic research suggests that Q. chrysolepis contains northern and southern lineages, with Q. tomentella sharing a more recent common ancestor with the southern lineage. One model suggests the split between Q. tomentella and the southern Q. chrysolepis lineage occurred in the late Pliocene or early pleistocene, with the southern lineage more closely related to Q. tomentella than the northern one. In addition to ancient introgression, Further, populations of island oak on the southern Channel Islands show widespread admixture with Q chrysoplepis, while little to no ancestry was detected on Santa Rosa or Ancapa Islands.

Populations of Q. tomentella are weakly genetically differentiated among the islands, with the Guadalupe Island population being the most genetically distinct. The weak differentiation suggests ongoing gene flow, possibly from northwesterly winds during flowering season carrying pollen between islands.

This species reproduces both from acorns and clonally. A large amount of clone island oaks are found on Santa Catalina and Santa Rosa islands, though genetic variability was still high on both islands. Groups of apparently separate trunks can belong to one genetic individual. For example in one grove on Santa Catalina, 14 sampled trees represented only two genotypes. Other groves have much more genetic diversity indicating reproduction through acorns. Acorns may be dispersed by animals or by gravity, with young trees frequently establishing themselves downslope of existing groves. Sapling survival is enhanced by protection from "nurse plants" such as toyon and more mature island oaks, island oak seedlings themselves have higher germination rates in canopy gaps or the edges of groves where there is more sunlight.

== Conservation ==
The island oak was listed as an endangered species by the International Union for Conservation of Nature.

The species is threatened by overgrazing from nonnative ungulates. The most rapid declines have occurred on Guadalupe Island. The trees there are apparently no longer reproducing. Feral goats have been abundant on the island for at least 150 years. The animals have eliminated much of the native vegetation and caused extensive soil erosion. Fenced enclosures have been helpful in the early recovery of some of the local flora.

== Gallery ==
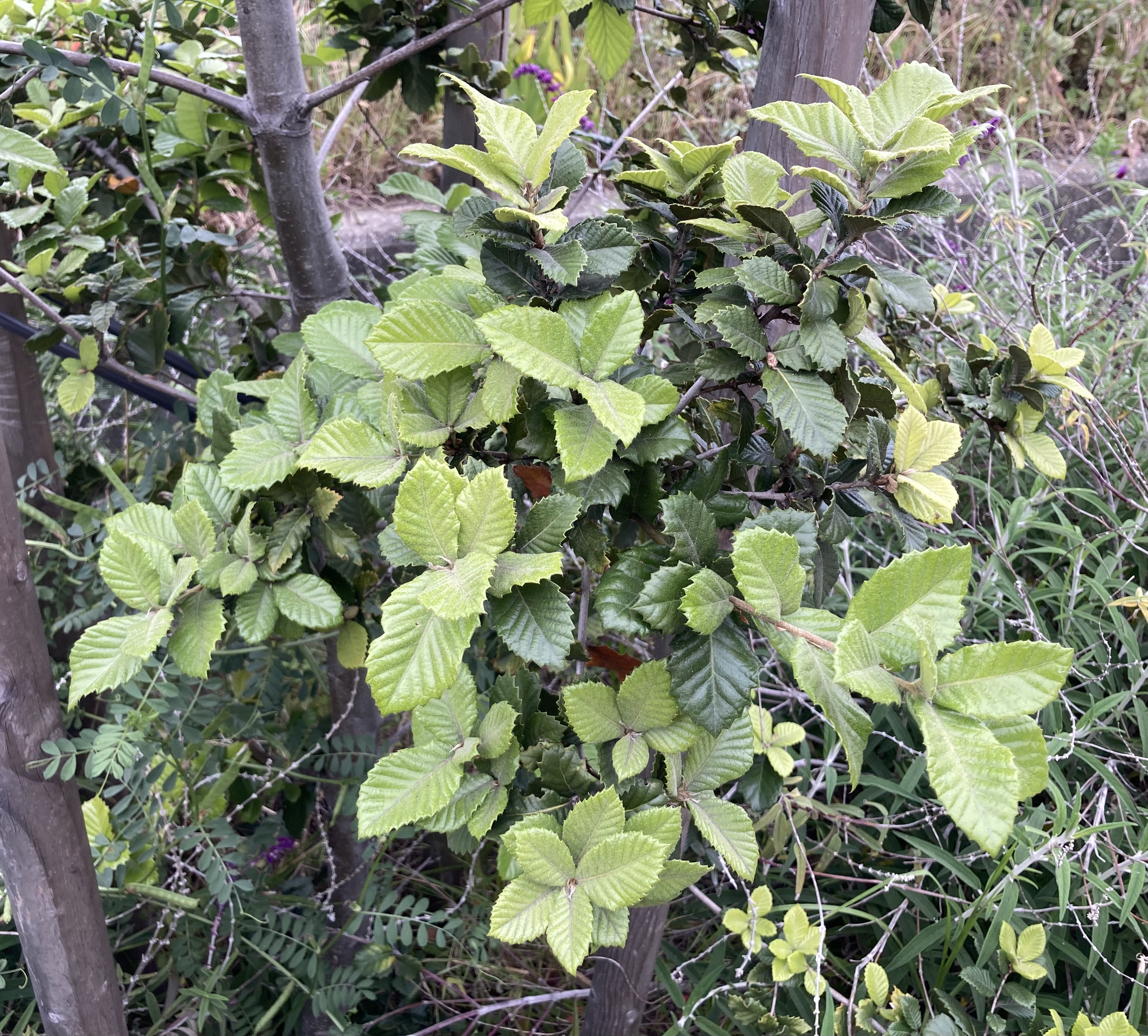
Detail of new leaves.

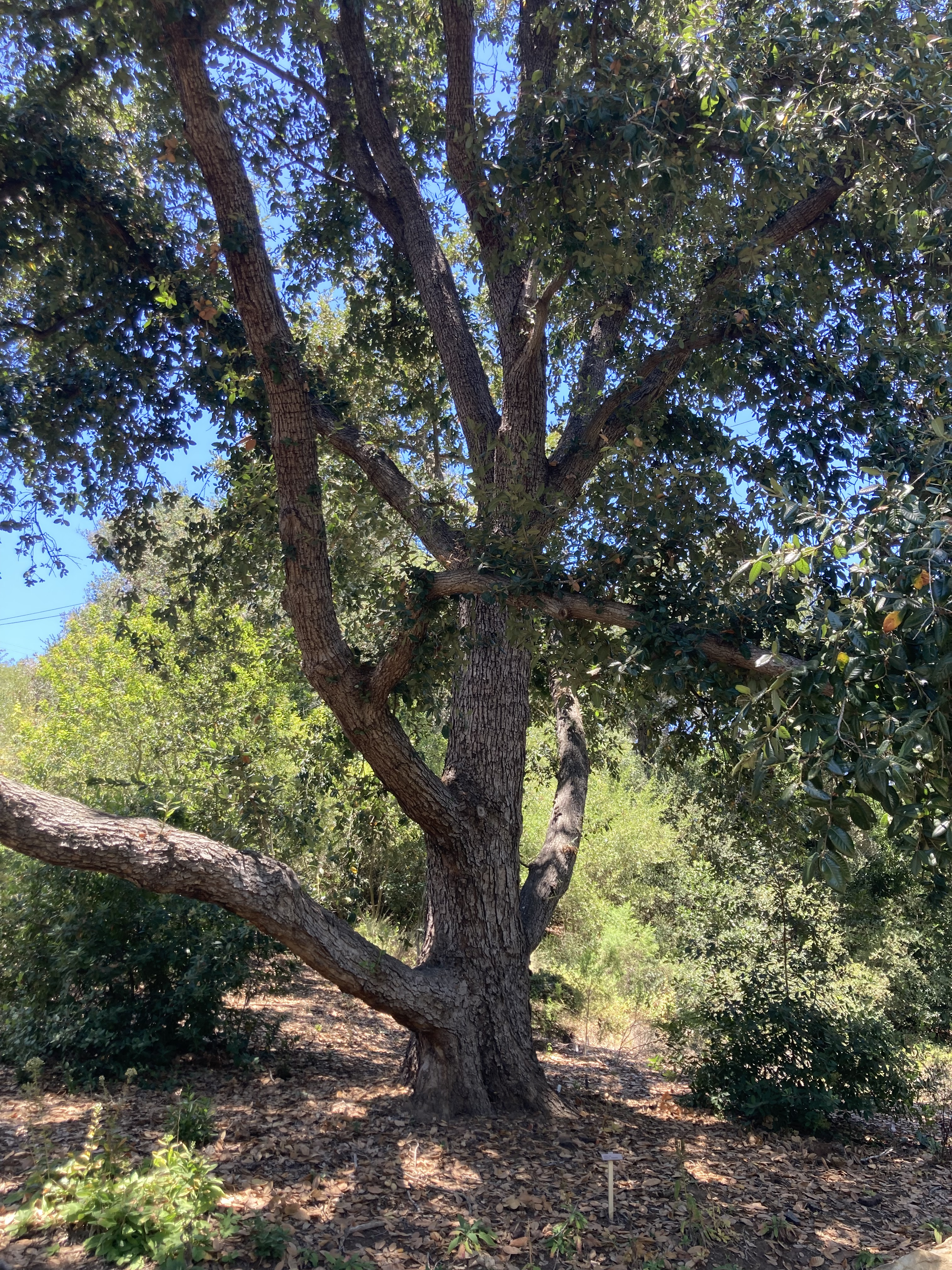
Mature specimen showing low, spreading branches and massive trunk

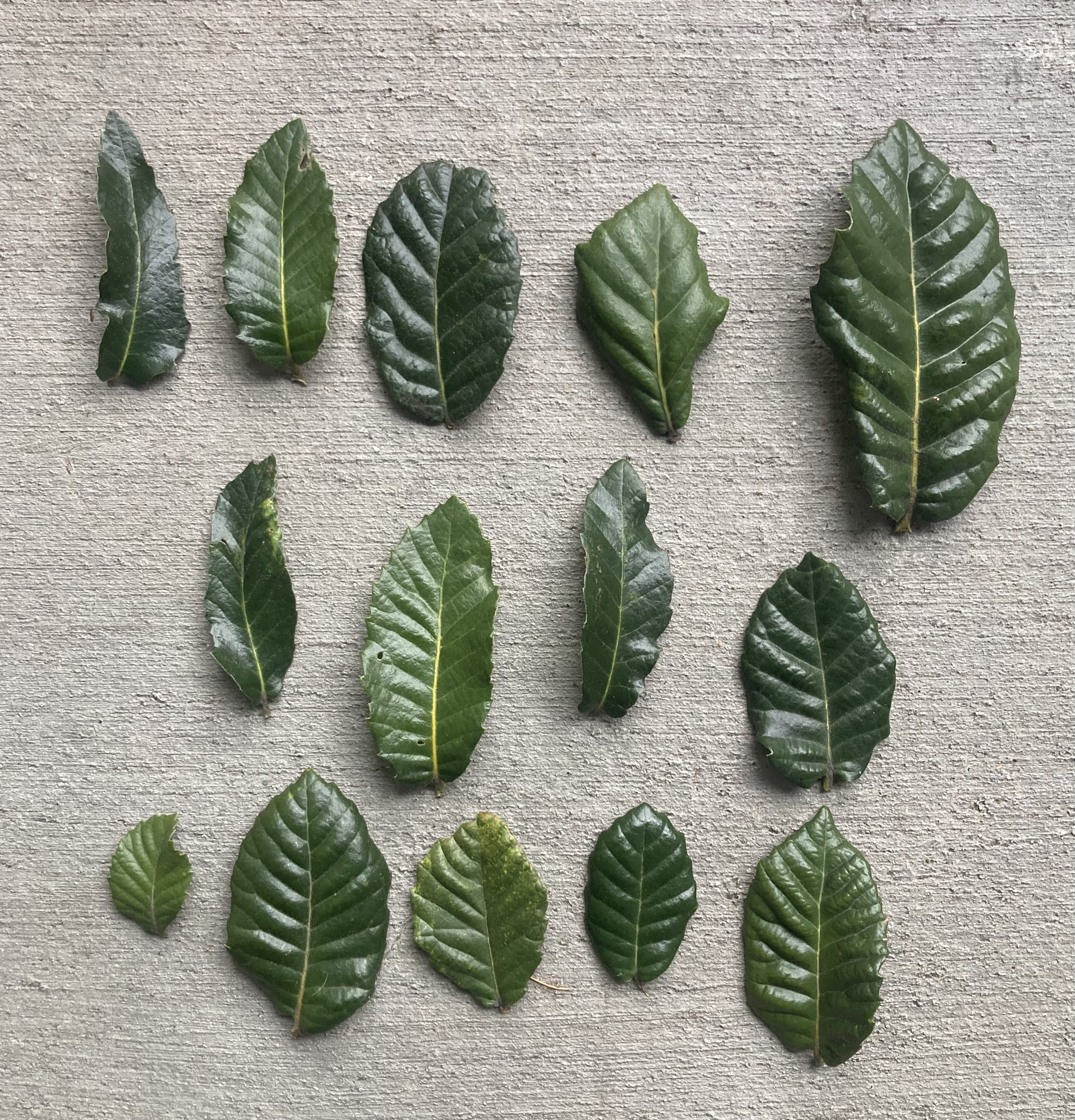
The variety of leaf shapes Quercus tomentella can have.

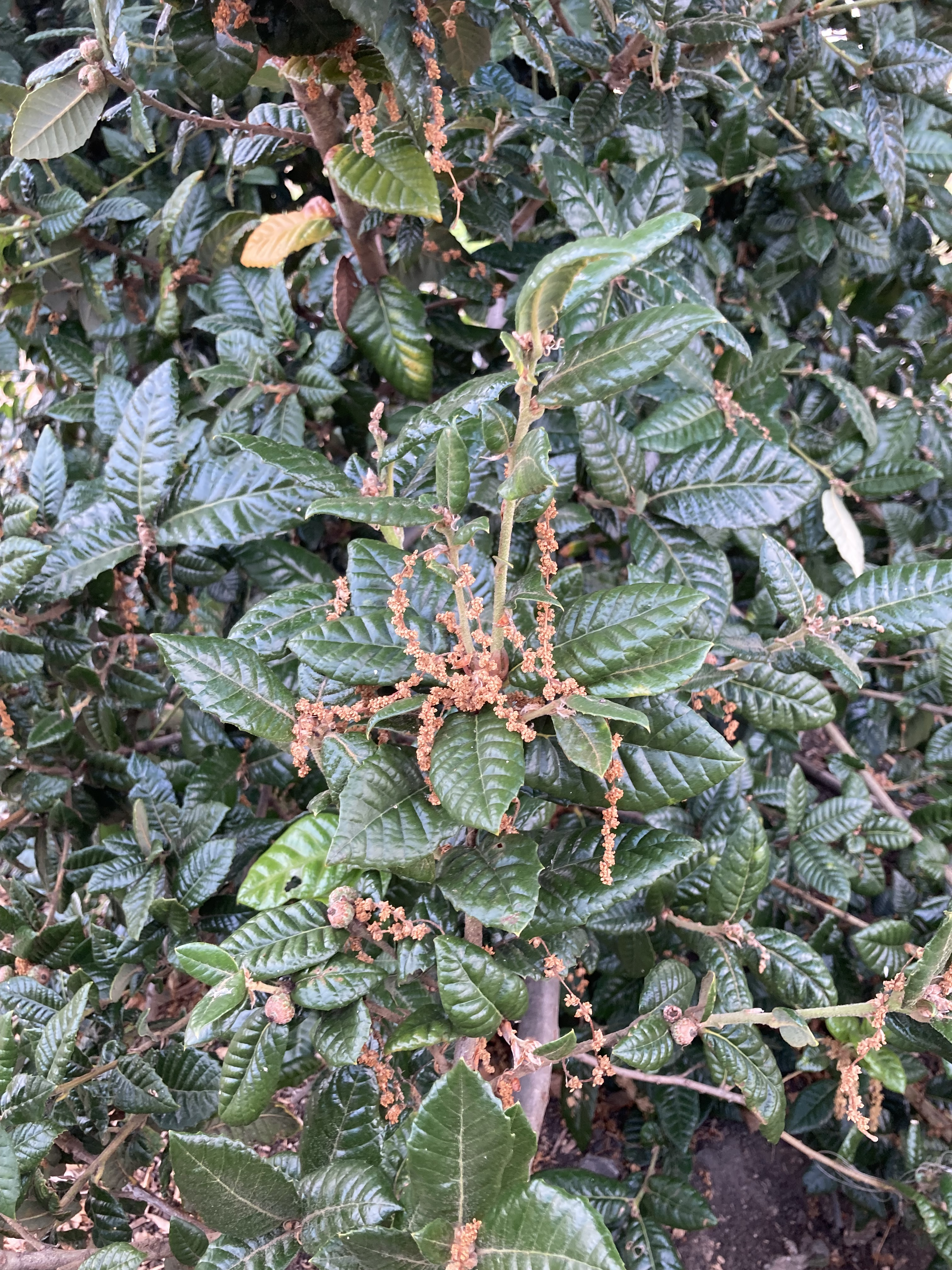
Catkins and leaves on a mature specimen
