= Santa Rosa Island (California) =

Island of the Channel Islands in California, United States

Native name: Isla de Santa Rosa (Spanish) Wi'ma (Cruzeño)
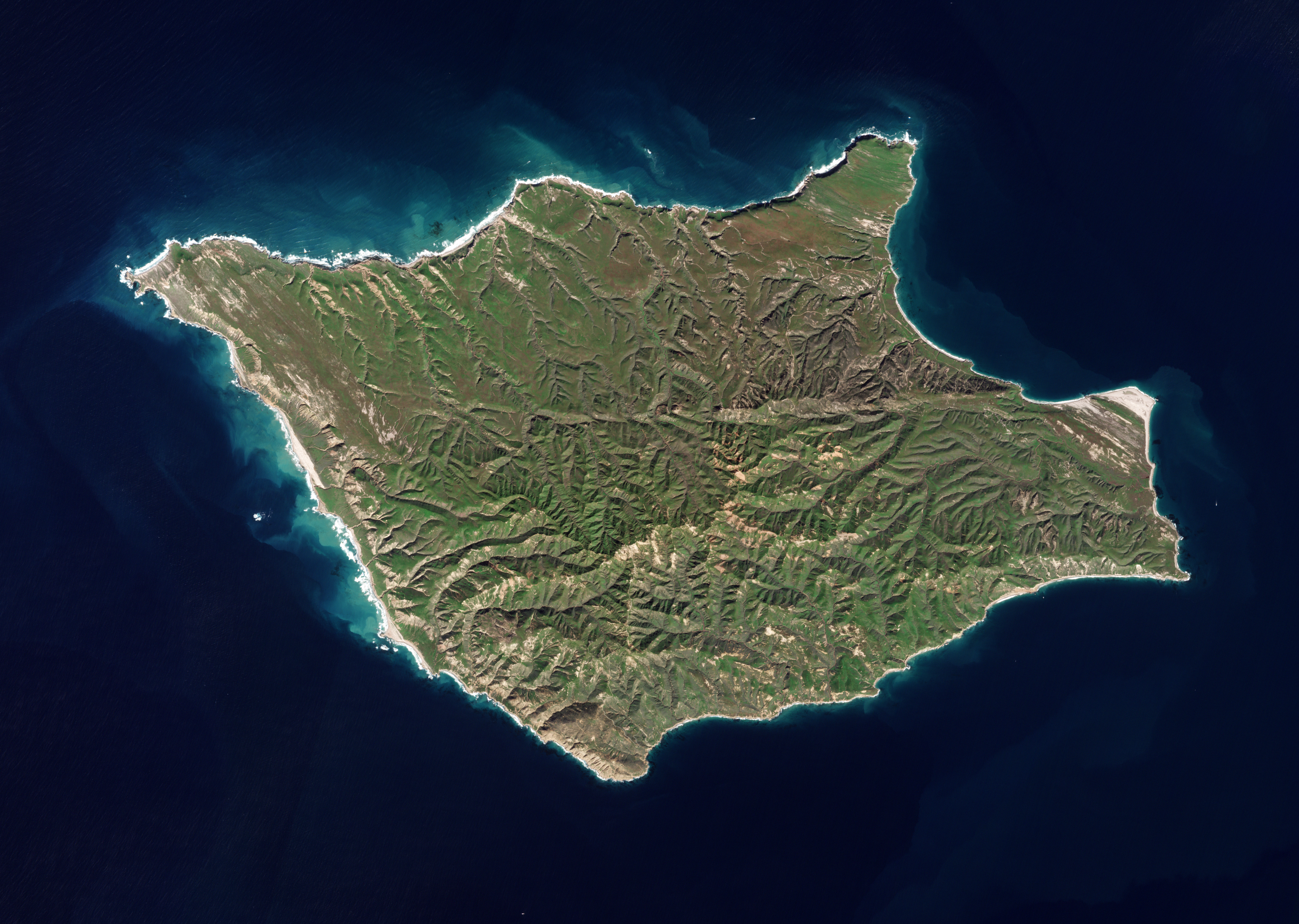
- Sentinel-2 satellite image

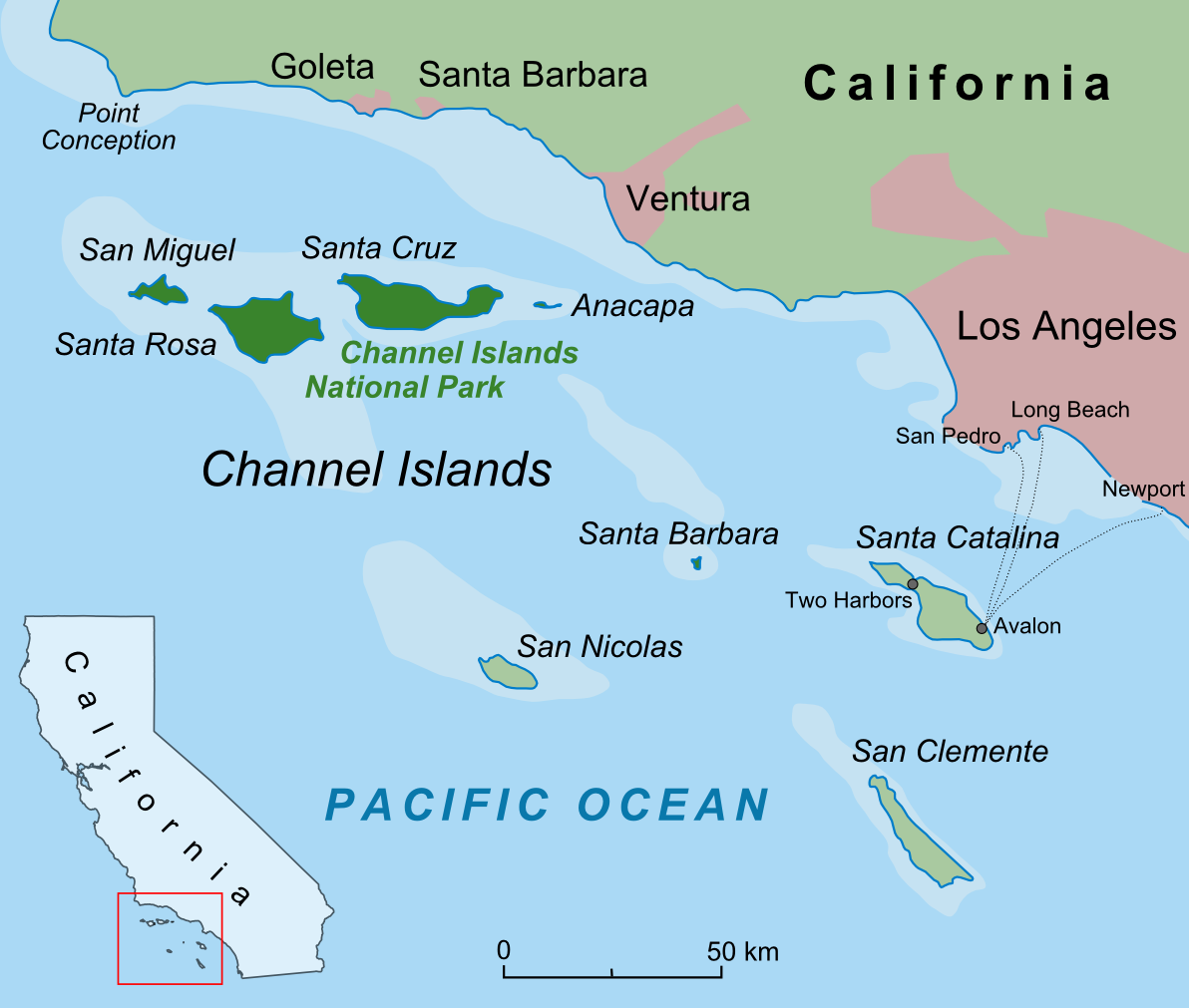
- Santa Rosa Island near the top left

Geography
- Location: North Pacific Ocean
- Coordinates: 33°58′N 120°06′W
- Area: 83.12 sq mi (215.3 km^{2})
- Area rank: 2nd largest of the Channel Islands
- Highest elevation: 1,589 ft (484.3 m)
- Highest point: Vail Peak

Administration
- United States
- State: California
- County: Santa Barbara
- National Park: Channel Islands
- Symbols

Demographics
- Population: 2 (2000)
- Pop. density: 0.024/sq mi (0.0093/km^{2})

Additional information
- Time zone: Pacific Time

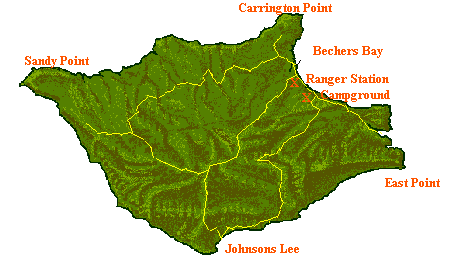
Santa Rosa Island

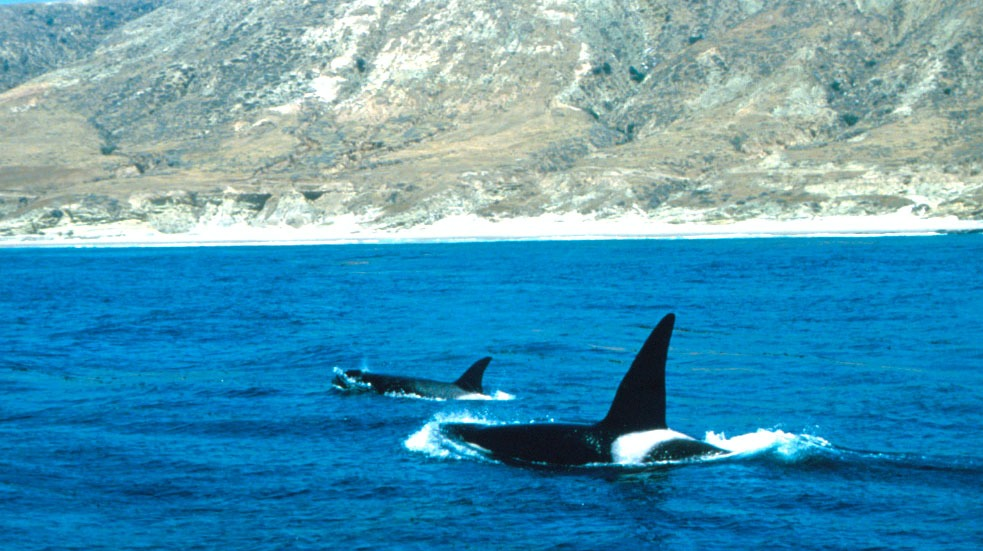
Orcas near Santa Rosa Island

Santa Rosa Island (Spanish: Isla de Santa Rosa; Cruzeño Chumash: Wi'ma) is the second largest of the Channel Islands of California at 53,195 acres (215.27 km^{2} or 83.118 sq mi). Santa Rosa is located about 26 miles (42 km) off the coast of Santa Barbara, California, in Santa Barbara County and is part of Channel Islands National Park.

The Chumash, a Native American people, lived on the Channel Islands at the time of European contact.

The remains of the 13,000-year-old Arlington Springs Man, possibly the oldest human remains in the Americas, were discovered on the island in 1959.

Santa Rosa Island is home to the rare Torrey pine, a species of pine tree that exists only in two locations around the world.

Public passenger access to Santa Rosa Island is provided by Island Packers ferry service out of the Ventura Harbor.

== Geography ==
The terrain consists of rolling hills, deep canyons, and a coastal lagoon. Highest peak is Vail Peak, at 1,589 feet (484 m).

During the last ice age, the four northern Channel Islands, including Santa Rosa Island, were conjoined into Santa Rosae, a single island that was only five miles (8 km) off the coast.

== History ==
=== Early history ===
The ancestors of the Chumash people lived on Santa Rosa for many thousands of years, establishing numerous village sites along the coast and in the interior. Recent research has documented the presence of maritime Paleocoastal peoples on the island at least 12,000 years ago.

The Chumash called the driftwood that washed up on the sandy beaches by the channel currents wimal. The logs were used to build tomols (plank canoes).

Juan Rodriguez Cabrillo's crew visited the island after his death, and found three Chumash villages, containing a total of 40-50 people. They called their island Wima, but George Vancouver listed it as Santa Rosa on his 1792 chart. He reported that this name appeared on a Spanish chart in his possession. Franciscan missionaries baptized a large number in 1822 and most were removed to their Mission Santa Barbara and Mission San Buenaventura by the late 1820s.

=== Land grants ===
George Nidever hunted sea otters for their pelts in the late 1830s and 1840s, under a license granted by the Mexican government to William Dana.

Governor Manuel Micheltorena made a Mexican land grant of the island of Santa Rosa to brothers José Antonio Carrillo and Carlos Antonio Carrillo in 1843. They gave the island to Carlos' daughters, Manuela Carrillo de Jones and Francisca Carrillo de Thompson. Their husbands, John Coffin Jones (1796–1861) and Alpheus Basil Thompson (1795–1869), entered into a partnership to manage the island.

In 1852, the Channel Islands were ceded to the United States by Mexico in the Treaty of Guadalupe Hidalgo ending the Mexican–American War. Also in 1852, a claim was filed with the Public Land Commission, but the grant was not patented to Manuela Carrillo de Jones and Francisca Carrillo de Thompson until 1871, though a district court confirmed clear title in 1856. Then, the Thompson-Jones partnership started to come apart in 1857. By 1870, the More brothers, consisting of Thomas Wallace (T.W.), Alexander (A.P.), and Henry had bought out all of the interests, and A.P. and Henry became joint owners of the island. They transformed the island into a large sheep ranch, with headquarters at Bechers Bay.

=== 20th century ===
The More family sold the island to Walter L. Vail and John V. Vickers in 1902. The Vail and Vickers Company transformed the sheep ranch into a cattle fattening operation.

The United States Army leased 46 acres for a radar post during WW II, and erected 16 buildings for 75 men, between Jan. and Aug. 1943. The site was abandoned after the end of the war. The United States Air Force built a 200-man, early-warning radar site in 1952 during the Cold War. At the same time, the United States Navy built a communication station on 4.5 acres on Navy Hill, to track missiles launched from Point Mugu NAS. The Air Force cancelled its lease in 1963.

Standard Oil Company obtained an exploration lease in 1932, but came up empty. Richfield Oil Company in 1938, and Superior Oil Company in 1947 were equally unsuccessful. In 1971 Mobil Oil Corporation obtained a lease and drilled six unsuccessful wells, plugging and abandoning the last one in 1975.

=== National park ===
In 1980, Santa Rosa Island was included within Channel Islands National Park over the objections of Vail & Vickers, which then successfully lobbied to have the legislation stipulate that purchase of their land would be the highest priority of the Channel Islands National Park. Vail & Vickers sold the island in 1986 for nearly $30 million. Subsequently, the National Park Service issued a series of five-year renewable special use permits. Threatened lawsuits in 1996 resulted in a settlement agreement, which included the end of all hunting and ranching operations, such that only one steer remained by 1998. Vail's 25 year use and occupancy agreement ended in December 2011.

In 2006 U.S. Representative Duncan Hunter (R-CA) introduced a provision into the annual defense policy bill that would allow disabled veterans to continue hunting elk on the island past 2011, without the consent of Vail & Vickers or the National Park Service. The provision stayed in the bill and was signed into law by President George W. Bush. This legislation was repealed by the next Congress as part of the FY 2007 Omnibus appropriations bill, also signed into law by President George W. Bush.

=== 2026 wildfire ===
A wildfire began on May 14, 2026, later growing to engulf at least one third of the island. A Coast Guard helicopter rescued a sailor stranded on the island. The Coast Guard initially stated that the likely cause of the fire was the sailor's firing of a flare gun, while the sailor said that his boat caught fire after an accidental grounding on the island and launched flares hours after the fire had started.

== Activities ==
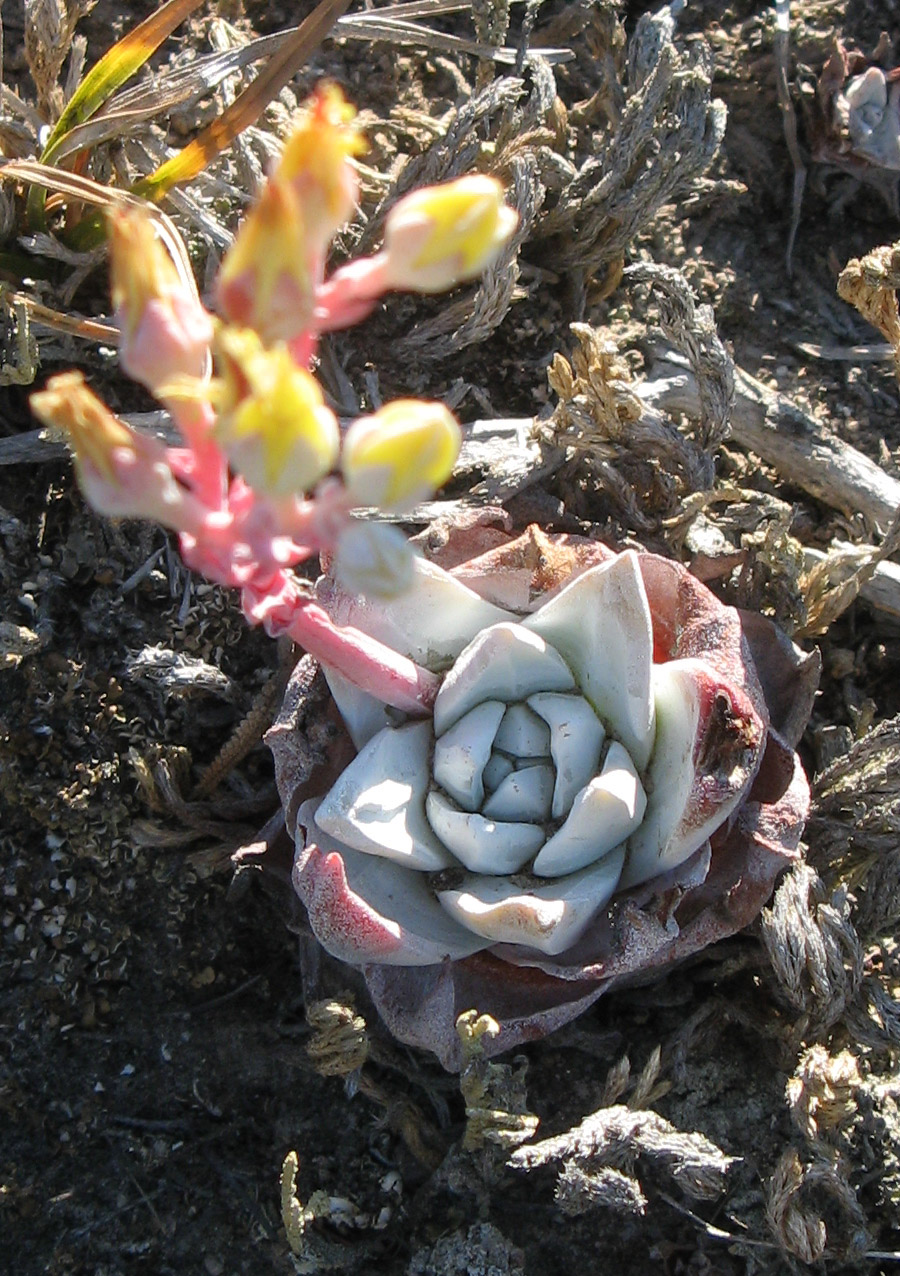
Munchkin dudleya, an endemic plant species

Recreational activities on Santa Rosa Island include kayaking, camping and hiking. A private boat charter company offers a number of trips to the island year round, and camping reservations can be made through Channel Islands National Park offices in Ventura, California. A year-round charter flight service is available from Camarillo Airport for hikers and campers to Santa Rosa Island.

=== CSUCI Research Station ===
In November 2012 the National Park Service (NPS) issued a permit to California State University, Channel Islands (CSUCI) to operate a field research station on Santa Rosa Island. The mission of the CSUCI Santa Rosa Island Research Station (SRIRS) is "to encourage and advance the interdisciplinary knowledge and stewardship of our natural and cultural resources through long-term research, inquiry-based education, and public outreach. (...) (and) to react energetically, adeptly, and successfully to our changing natural and human landscapes."

== Ecology and climate ==
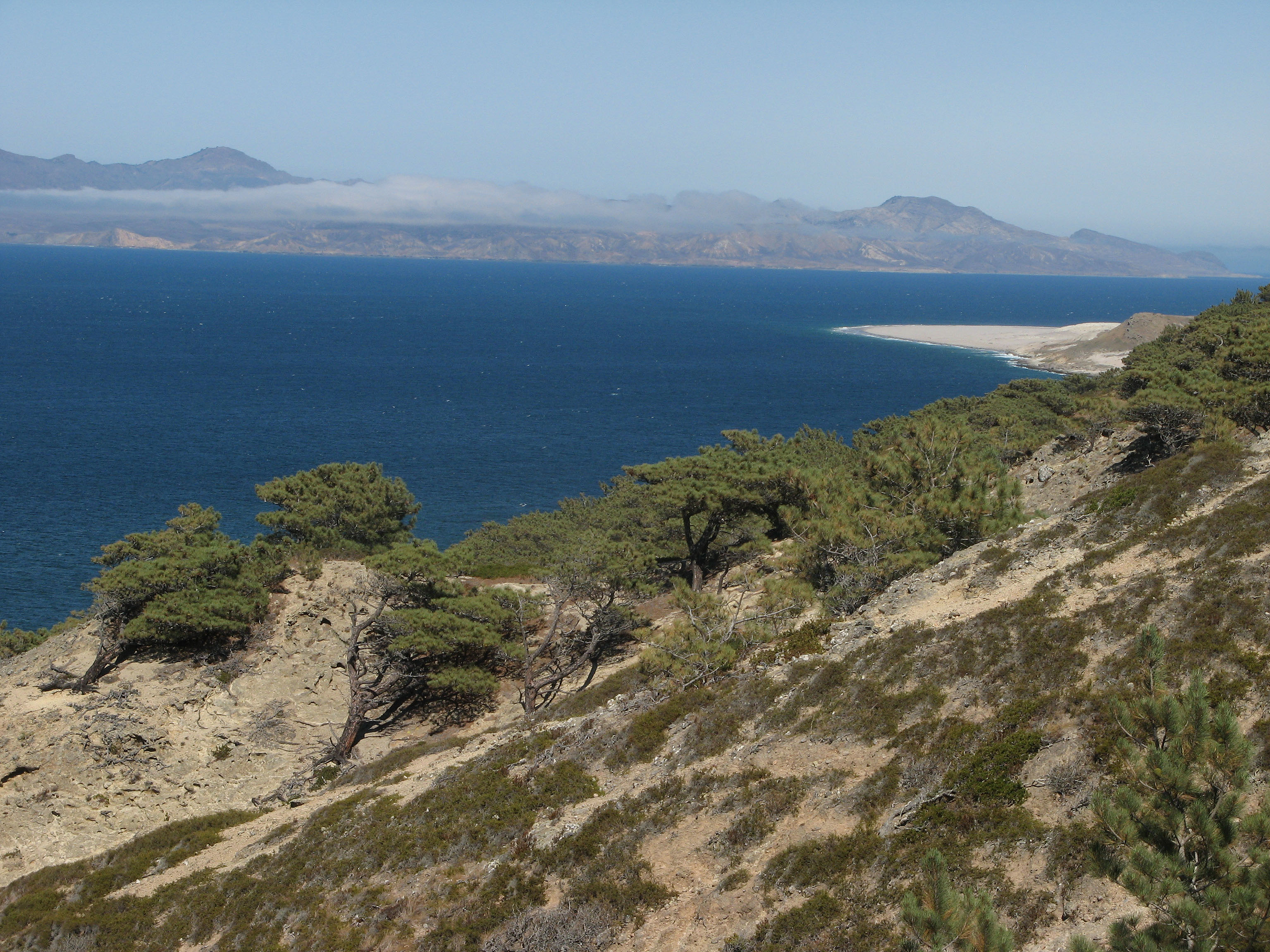
Torrey pine grove on Santa Rosa island. View towards Santa Cruz Island.

A variety of the Torrey pine (Pinus torreyana var. insularis) grows on the island. The population of this endangered species is estimated at 1000 trees. The island oak (Quercus tomentella) is native to the island.

Flightless geese, giant mice and pygmy mammoths are extinct, while the island fox, spotted skunk, and munchkin dudleya (Dudleya gnoma) (one of the six endemic plant species on the island) still live there. The island is home to one of only three known populations of Hoffman's rockcress.

Its surrounding waters serve as a nursery for the sea life that feeds larger marine mammals and seabirds. Great white sharks, including some adults over 15 feet in length, are fairly common in the northern Channel Islands (especially San Miguel and Santa Rosa) and feed on the abundant marine mammals. It is unwise to swim or dive alone near seal colonies where white sharks may be present.

The rare endemic lichen Caloplaca obamae, discovered in 2007 and described by Kerry Knudsen in 2009, commemorates United States President Barack Obama.

Santa Rosa Island has a warm-summer Mediterranean climate (Csb in the Köppen climate classification).

Climate data for Santa Rosa Island, California, 1991–2020 averages, extremes 1990–present
Month	Jan	Feb	Mar	Apr	May	Jun	Jul	Aug	Sep	Oct	Nov	Dec	Year
Record high °F (°C)	87 (31)	85 (29)	89 (32)	95 (35)	96 (36)	100 (38)	100 (38)	100 (38)	109 (43)	98 (37)	92 (33)	86 (30)	109 (43)
Mean maximum °F (°C)	76.2 (24.6)	74.6 (23.7)	75.1 (23.9)	80.4 (26.9)	79.5 (26.4)	80.1 (26.7)	82.0 (27.8)	85.7 (29.8)	91.3 (32.9)	88.8 (31.6)	83.0 (28.3)	75.2 (24.0)	94.5 (34.7)
Mean daily maximum °F (°C)	59.3 (15.2)	58.2 (14.6)	58.5 (14.7)	58.9 (14.9)	60.2 (15.7)	63.2 (17.3)	67.1 (19.5)	68.6 (20.3)	70.8 (21.6)	69.3 (20.7)	64.4 (18.0)	59.1 (15.1)	63.1 (17.3)
Daily mean °F (°C)	53.6 (12.0)	52.5 (11.4)	52.3 (11.3)	52.4 (11.3)	53.6 (12.0)	56.2 (13.4)	59.8 (15.4)	61.1 (16.2)	63.0 (17.2)	62.0 (16.7)	57.9 (14.4)	53.4 (11.9)	56.5 (13.6)
Mean daily minimum °F (°C)	48.0 (8.9)	46.9 (8.3)	46.2 (7.9)	46.1 (7.8)	47.3 (8.5)	49.6 (9.8)	52.5 (11.4)	53.6 (12.0)	55.3 (12.9)	54.7 (12.6)	51.4 (10.8)	47.7 (8.7)	49.9 (10.0)
Mean minimum °F (°C)	40.4 (4.7)	40.1 (4.5)	40.3 (4.6)	41.0 (5.0)	43.4 (6.3)	45.7 (7.6)	48.5 (9.2)	49.6 (9.8)	49.8 (9.9)	48.3 (9.1)	44.1 (6.7)	40.5 (4.7)	37.6 (3.1)
Record low °F (°C)	34 (1)	32 (0)	35 (2)	34 (1)	39 (4)	42 (6)	45 (7)	45 (7)	47 (8)	43 (6)	38 (3)	28 (−2)	28 (−2)
Average precipitation inches (mm)	1.87 (47)	2.71 (69)	1.67 (42)	0.75 (19)	0.26 (6.6)	0.10 (2.5)	0.07 (1.8)	0.06 (1.5)	0.11 (2.8)	0.35 (8.9)	0.76 (19)	1.81 (46)	10.51 (267)
Source 1: NOAA
Source 2: WRCC (precipitation)

== Archaeology ==
The remains of pygmy mammoths (Mammuthus exilis), which appear to have gone extinct about 13,000 years ago, have been excavated on the island.

Archaeologist Phil Orr of the Santa Barbara Museum of Natural History was the founder of research on the prehistory of Santa Rosa Island. After conducting 25 years of field research here, he published the results of his work in 1968.

In 1959, Orr discovered the remains of 13,000-year-old Arlington Springs Man, the oldest reliably dated human remains in the Americas, on the island. The remains were found in an arroyo 37 feet (11 m) below the existing ground surface. They were carefully preserved, and were finally analyzed in 1987, when radiocarbon dating methods were improved, by scientists Don Morris and John Johnson.

Back 13,000 years ago, the site of the discovery would have been an interior island location, several miles from where the coast then existed.

The archaeologically sensitive areas of the island were listed as a historic district on the National Register of Historic Places in 2022.

== Gallery ==
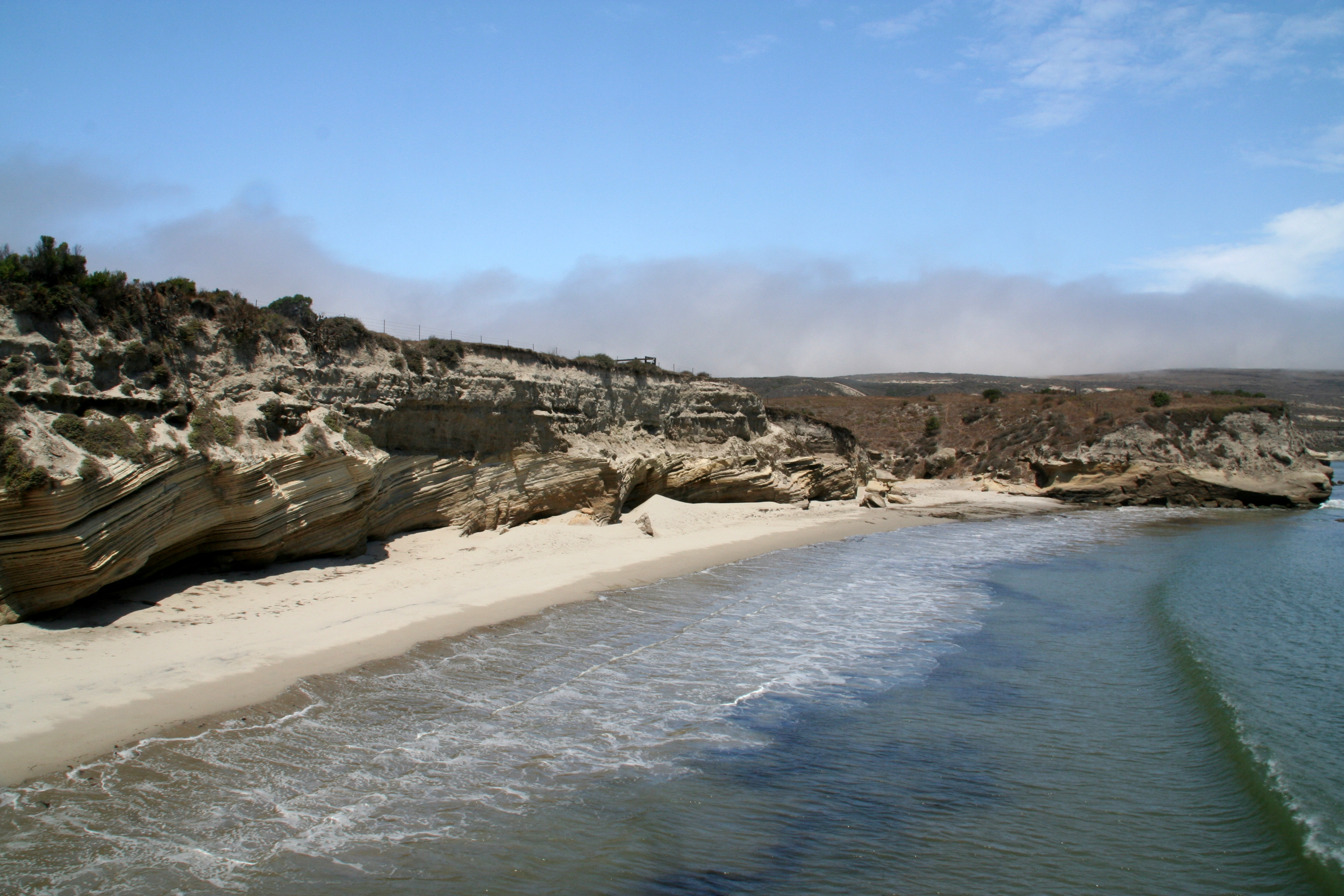
Beach by the pier

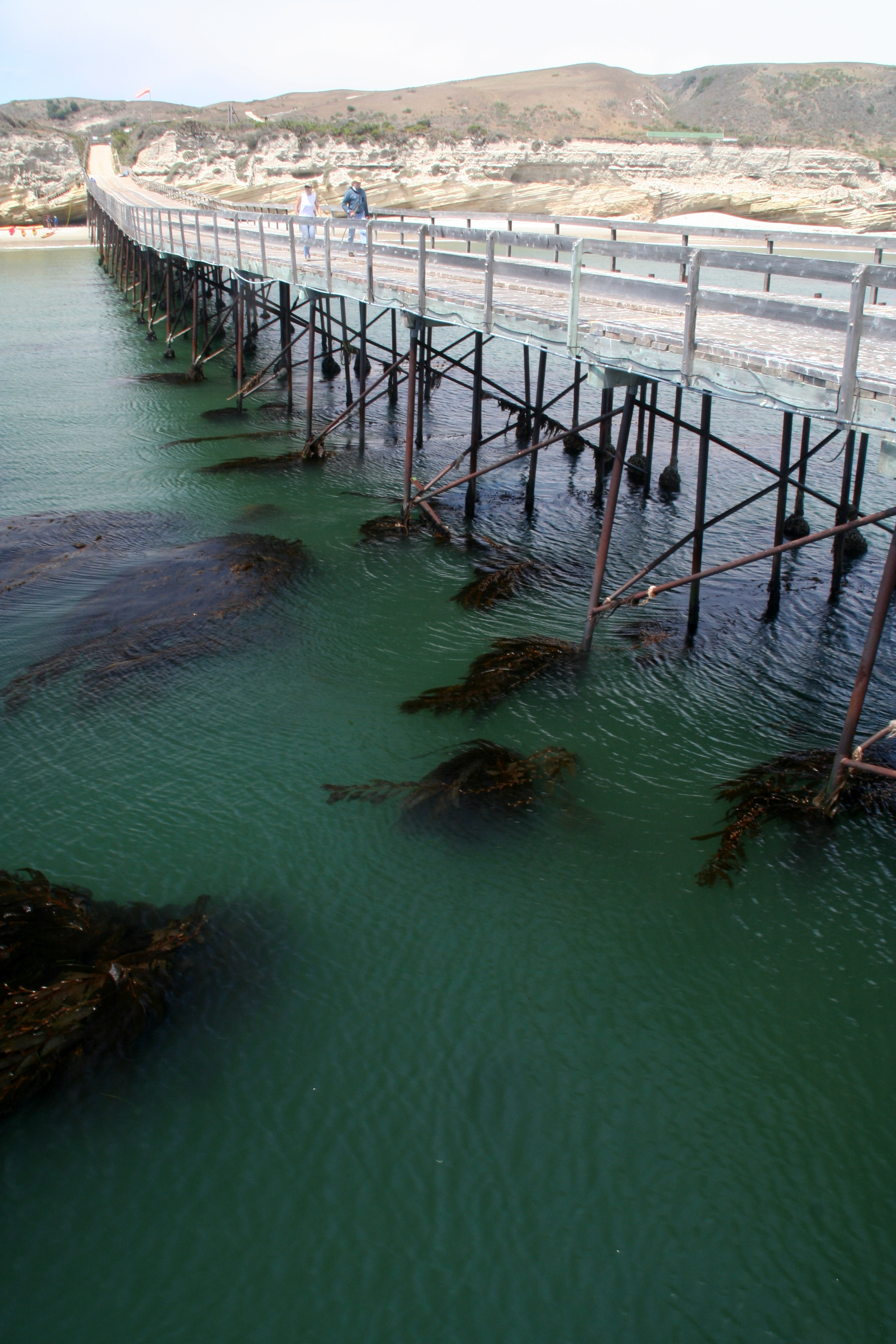
Pier at Santa Rosa Island

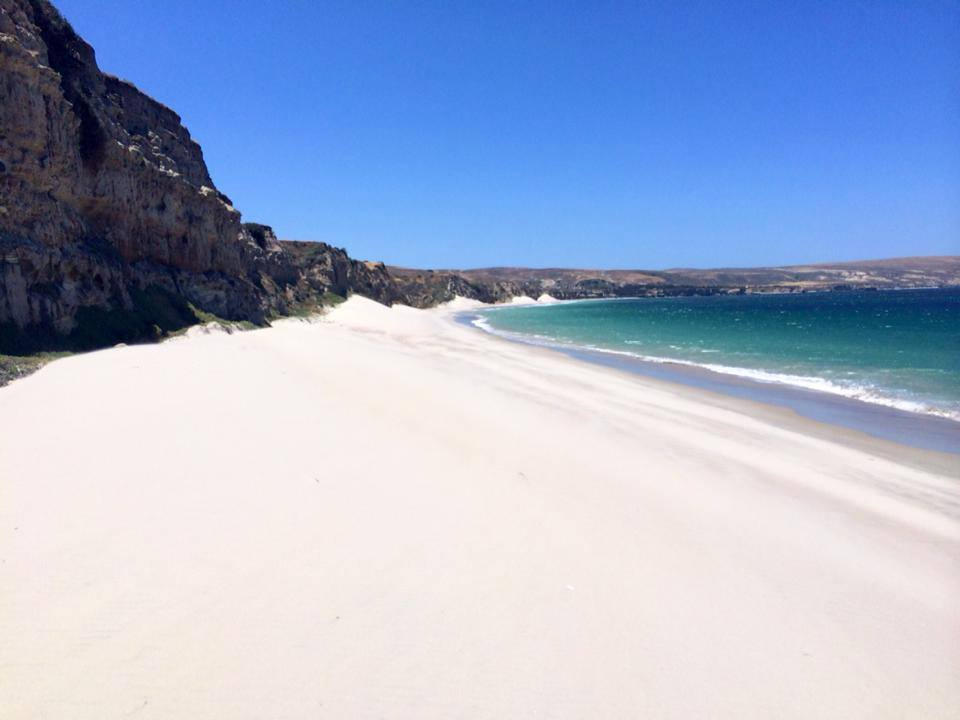
White sand beach

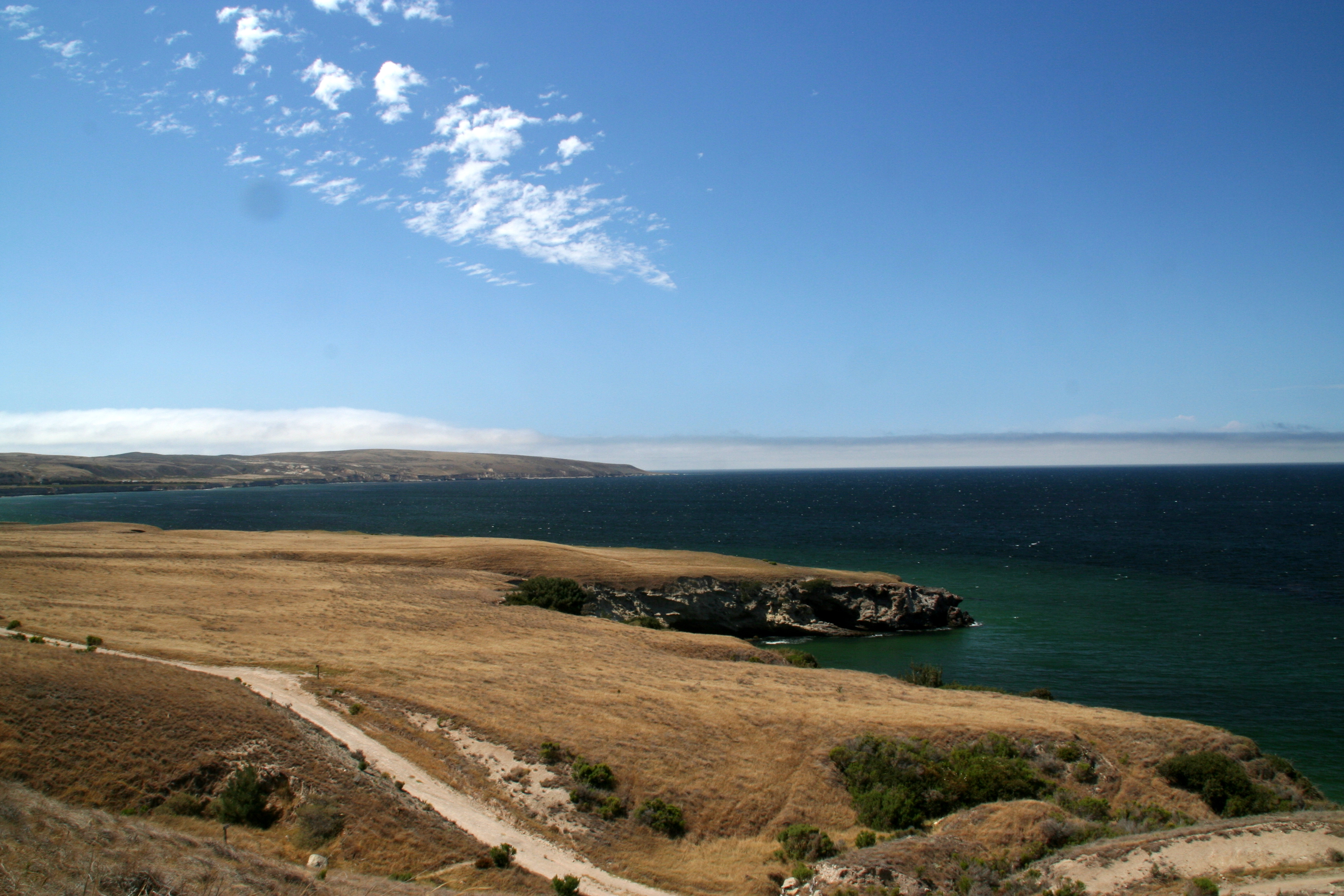
View from the top of Torrey Pines Hill

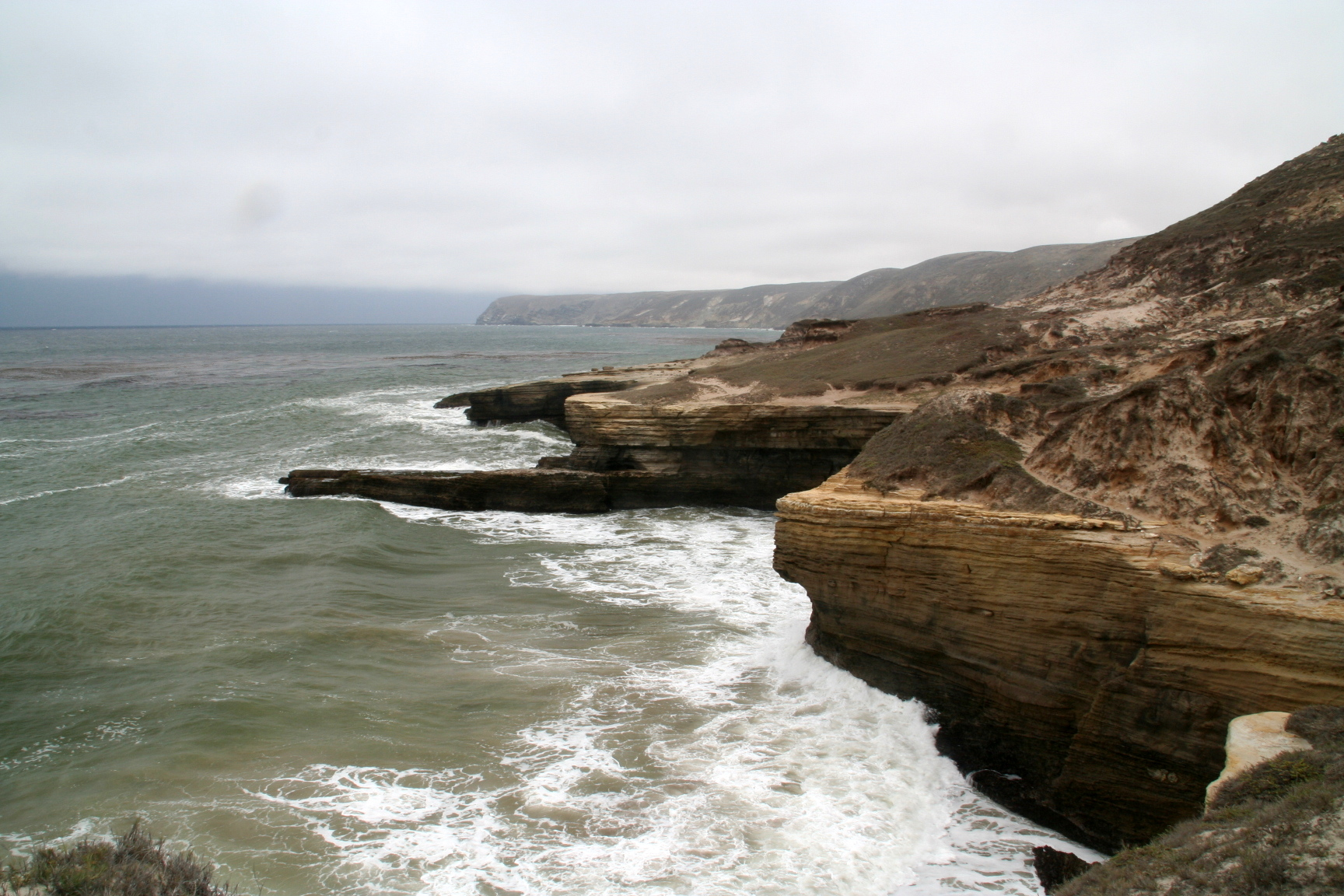
The northern part of the island

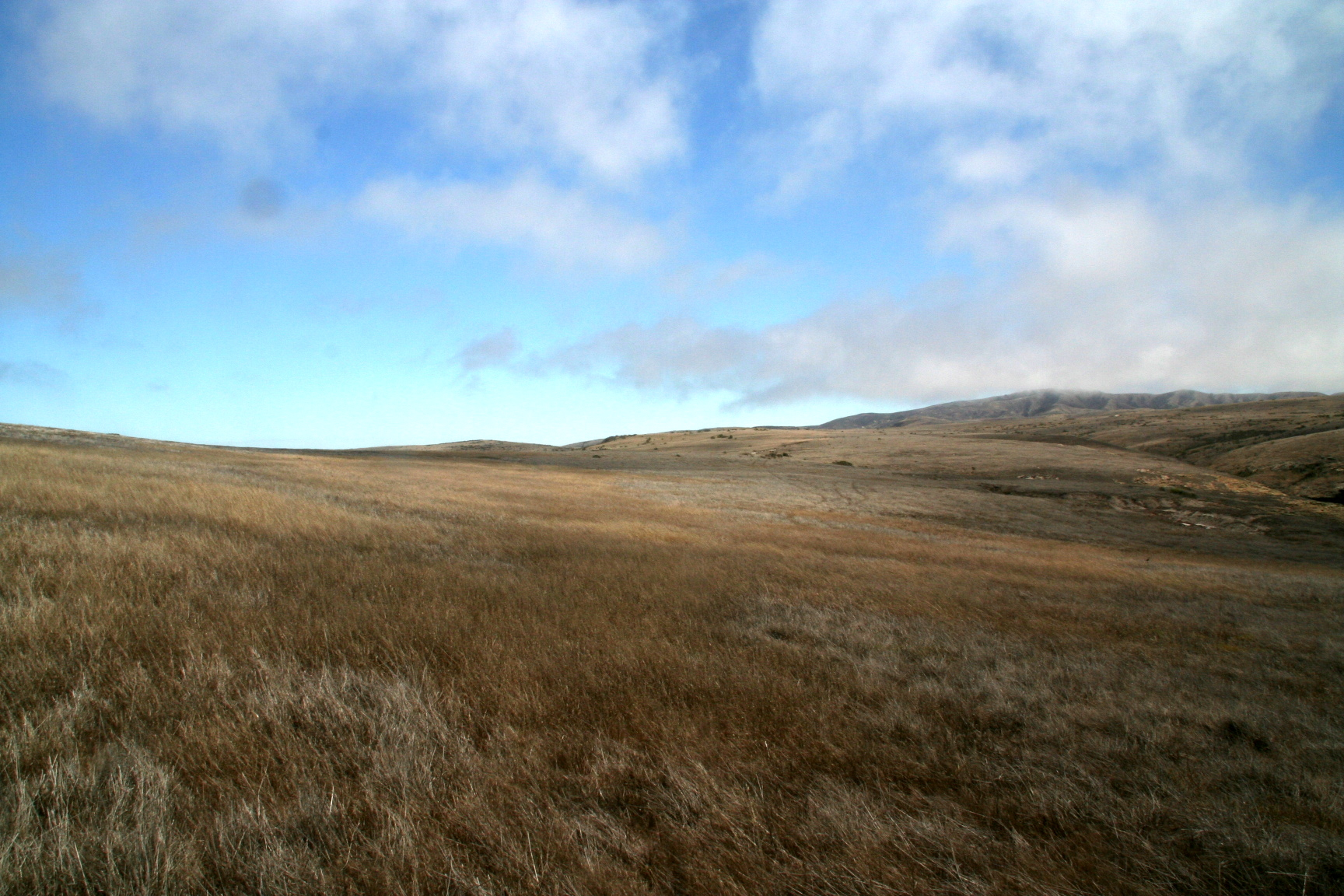
View of the island

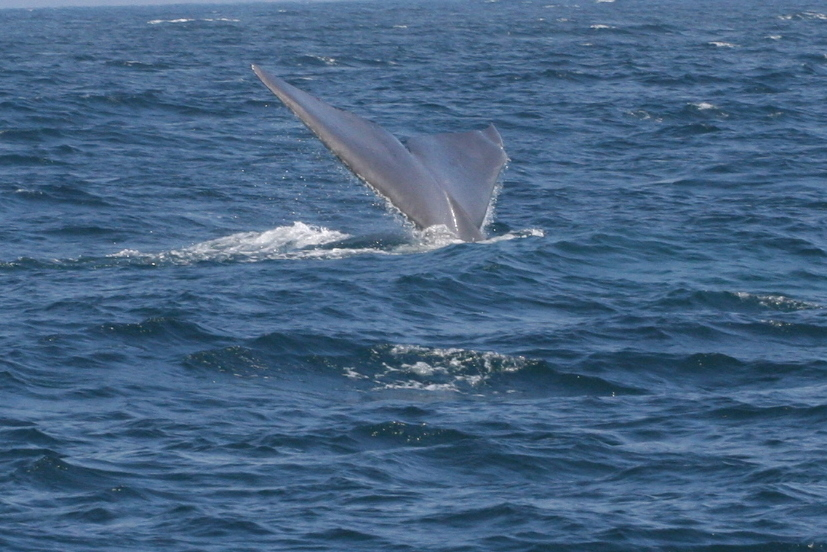
Whale watching around the island (humpback whale)

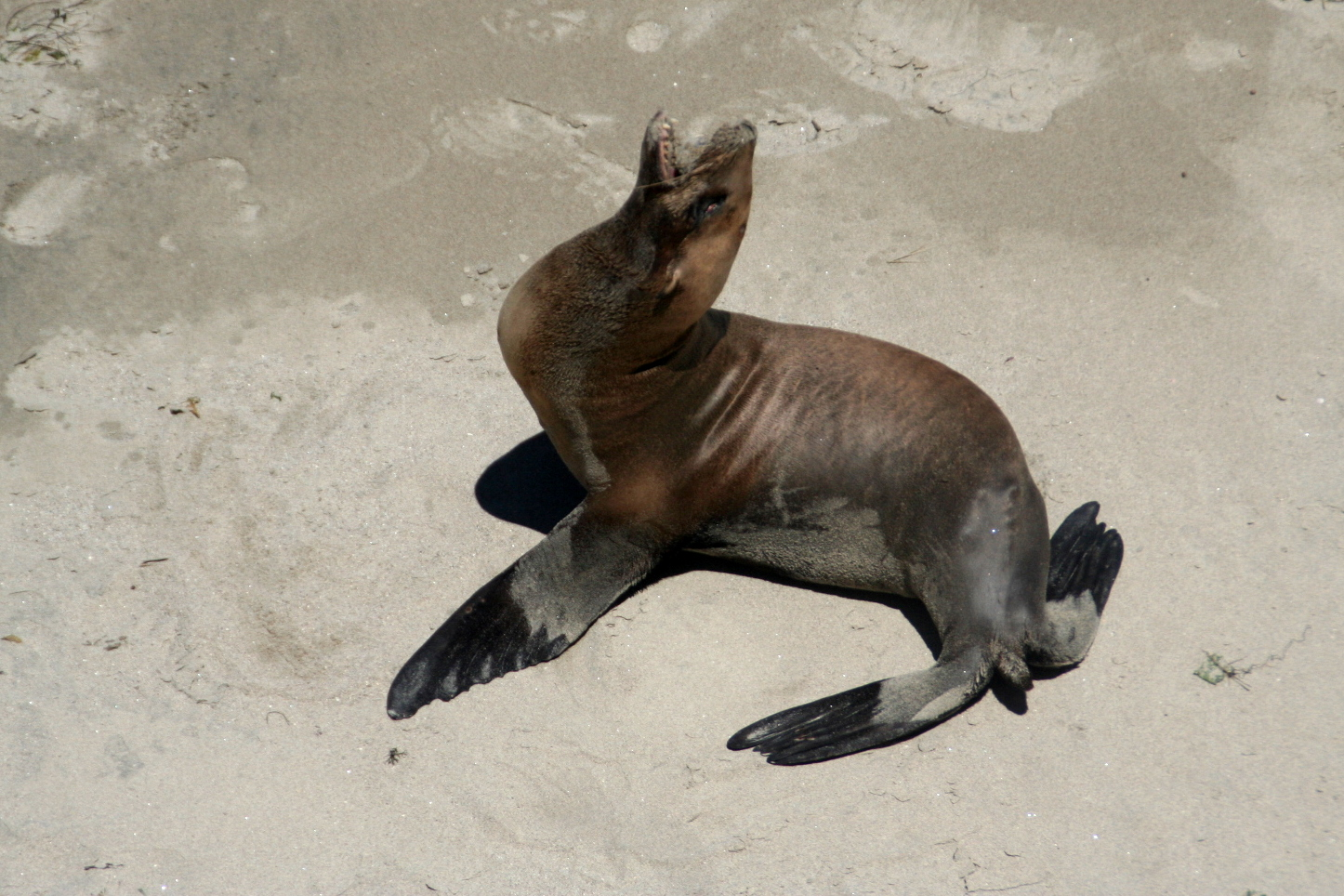
California sea lion (Zalophus californianus) by the pier

== See also ==
- Index: Flora of the Channel Islands of California
- Channel Islands National Marine Sanctuary
