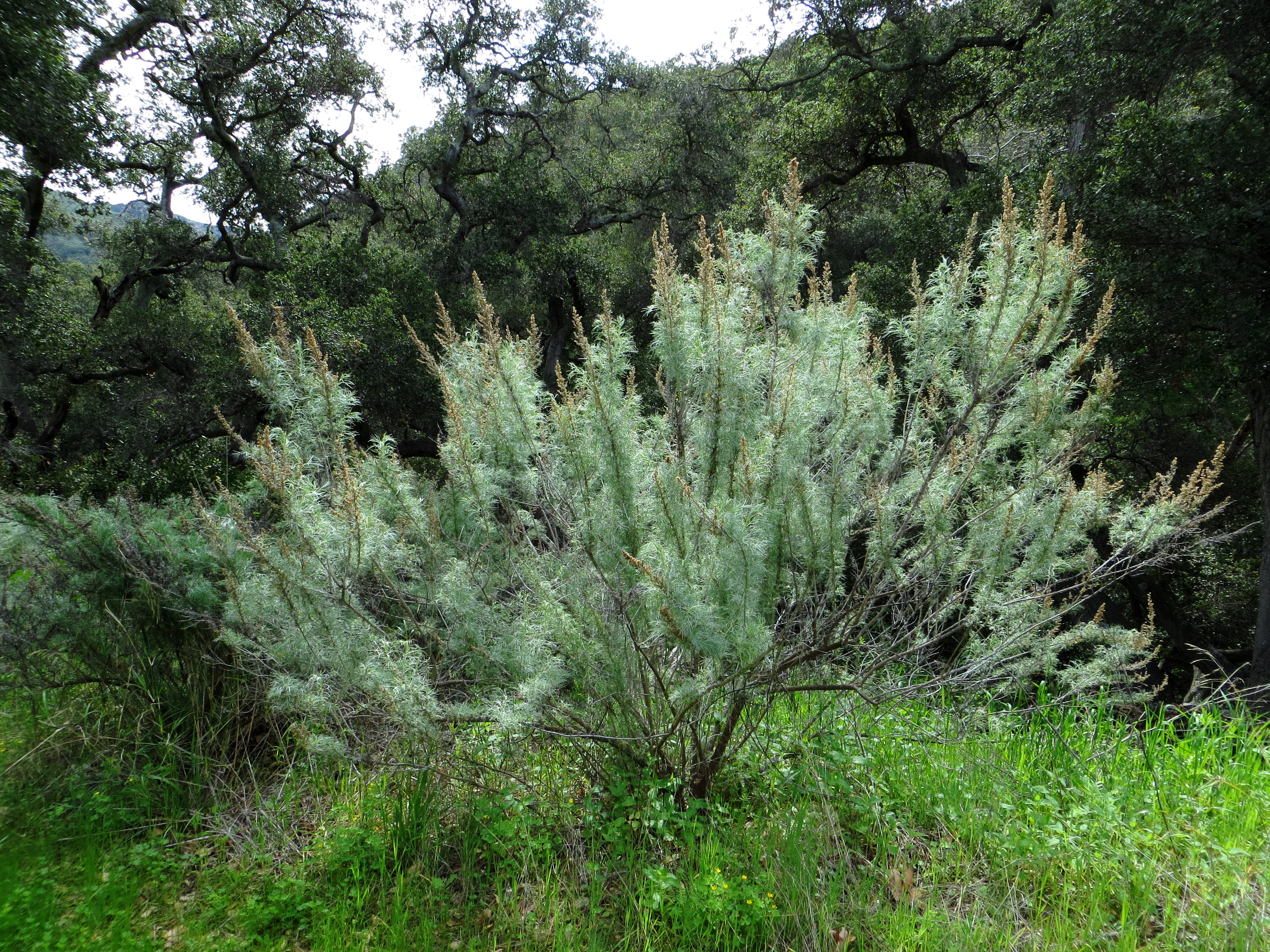
- Artemisia californica in Gaviota State Park, California

Conservation status
- Apparently Secure (NatureServe)

Scientific classification
- Kingdom: Plantae
- Clade: Tracheophytes
- Clade: Angiosperms
- Clade: Eudicots
- Clade: Asterids
- Order: Asterales
- Family: Asteraceae
- Genus: Artemisia
- Species: A. californica

Binomial name
- Artemisia californica Less.

Synonyms
- Artemisia abrotanoides Nutt.; Artemisia fischeriana Besser; Artemisia foliosa Nutt.; Crossostephium californicum (Less.) Rydb.

= Artemisia californica =

Species of plant

Artemisia californica, also known as California sagebrush or cowboy cologne (due to its fragrant smell), is a species of shrub in the sunflower family that is endemic to western California and northwestern Baja California.

California sagebrush is considered a keystone species within its native habitat due to its widespread ecosystem services and prevalence. In the western United States, California sagebrush is often grown in native plant gardens and as a drought-resistant landscaping choice. In addition to its drought resistance and capacity to draw pollinators like bees and butterflies, its silvery foliage is popular with gardeners and horticulturists.

== Description ==
Artemisia californica branches from the base and grows out from there, becoming rounded; it grows 1.5 to 2.5 metres (5 to 8 feet) tall. The stems of the plant are slender, flexible, and glabrous (hairless) or canescent (fuzzy). The leaves range from 1 to 10 centimetres (1/2 to 4 inches) long and are pinnately divided with 2–4 threadlike lobes less than 5 cm long. Their leaves are hairy and light green to gray in color; the margins of the leaves curl under.

The inflorescences are leafy, narrow, and sparse. The capitula are less than 5 millimetres (3/16 in) in diameter. The pistillate flowers range in number from 6 to 10 and the disk flowers range from 15 to 30; they are generally yellowish, but sometimes red.

Artemisia species are sunflower (Asteraceae) family members; however, unlike many other members of the family, they often produce small, unnoticeable blooms. Their attractive silvery leaf, which is often fragrant when crushed, is their strongest feature in the garden. The often pleasing perfume of the stems and leaves is caused by essential oils, which also deters animal and insect pests. They are an essential source of food for local wildlife because they flower late in the season. The genus Artemisia is widespread in the Old and New Worlds, and many species have been utilized for hundreds of years in Europe, Asia, and the Americas in horticulture, cooking, and medicine.

California sagebrush is sometimes confused for a true sage (Salvia) due to its common name and leaves that smells like sage. It is a crucial part of the community of coastal sage scrub habitat and is frequently widely utilized in restoration initiatives. When planted in full sun, it can reach heights and widths of roughly 4' and 4'. Once established, it may survive without additional water, but will appear happier when watered occasionally in the deep summer. Sagebrush's beautifully split gray leaves contrast nicely with the garden's lush green vegetation.

The fruits produced are resinous achenes up to 1.5 mm long. There is a pappus present that forms a minute crown on the achene body.

The plant contains terpenes which make it quite aromatic. Many people regard the species as having a pleasant smell.

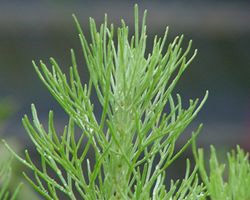
Young green foliage

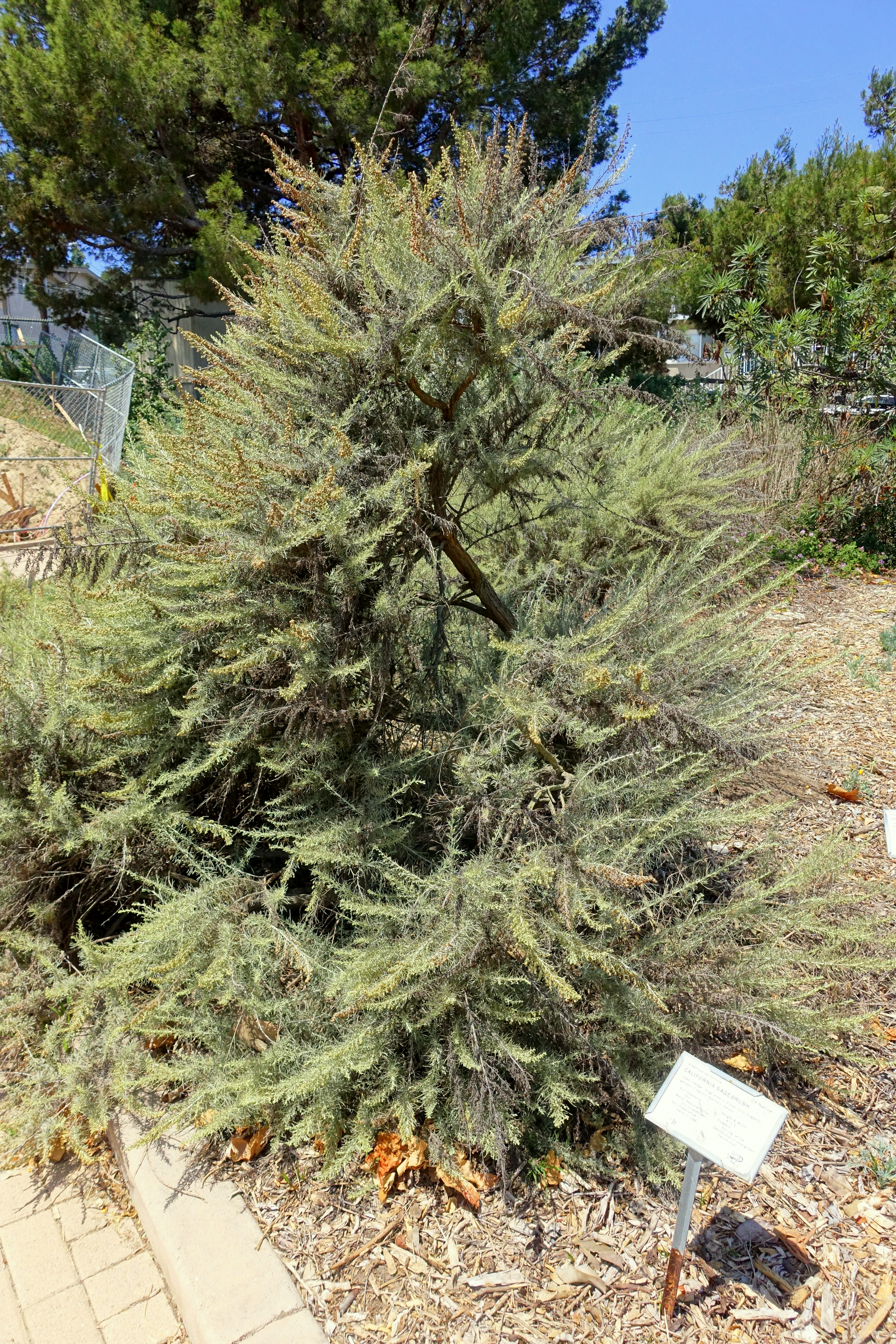
Specimen in Manhattan Beach Botanical Garden

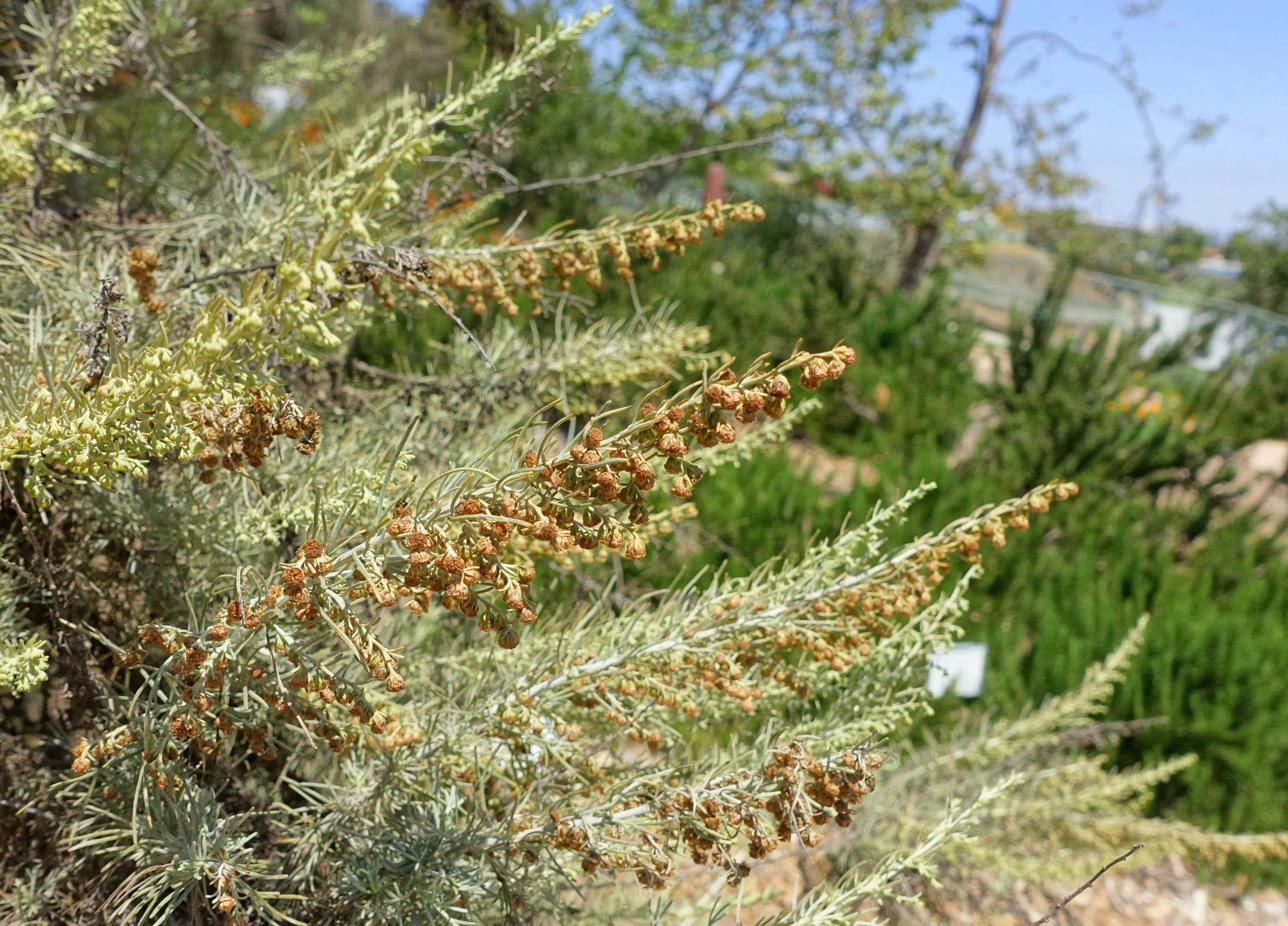
Close-up of foliage with dry flowers

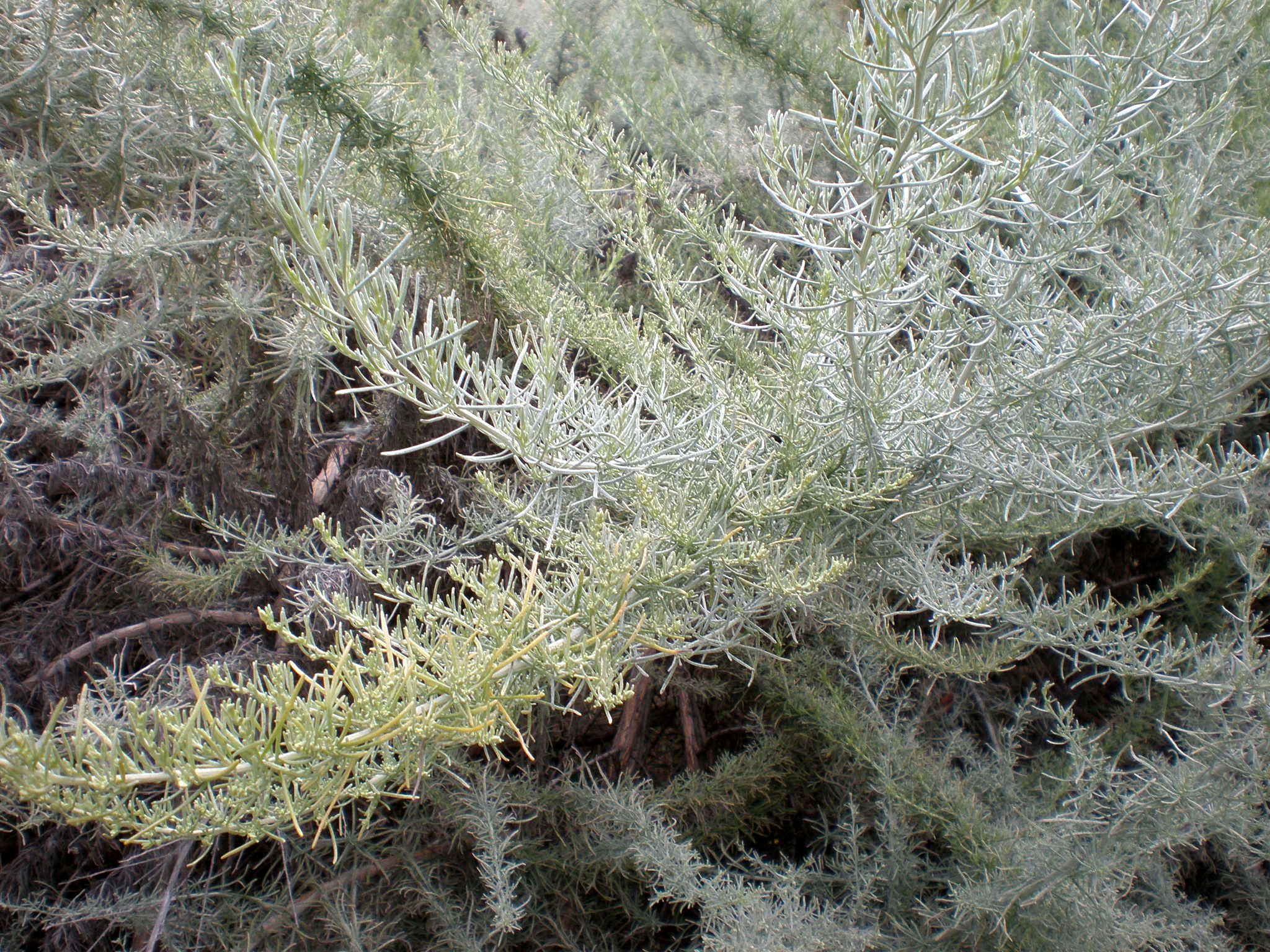
Mature gray foliage

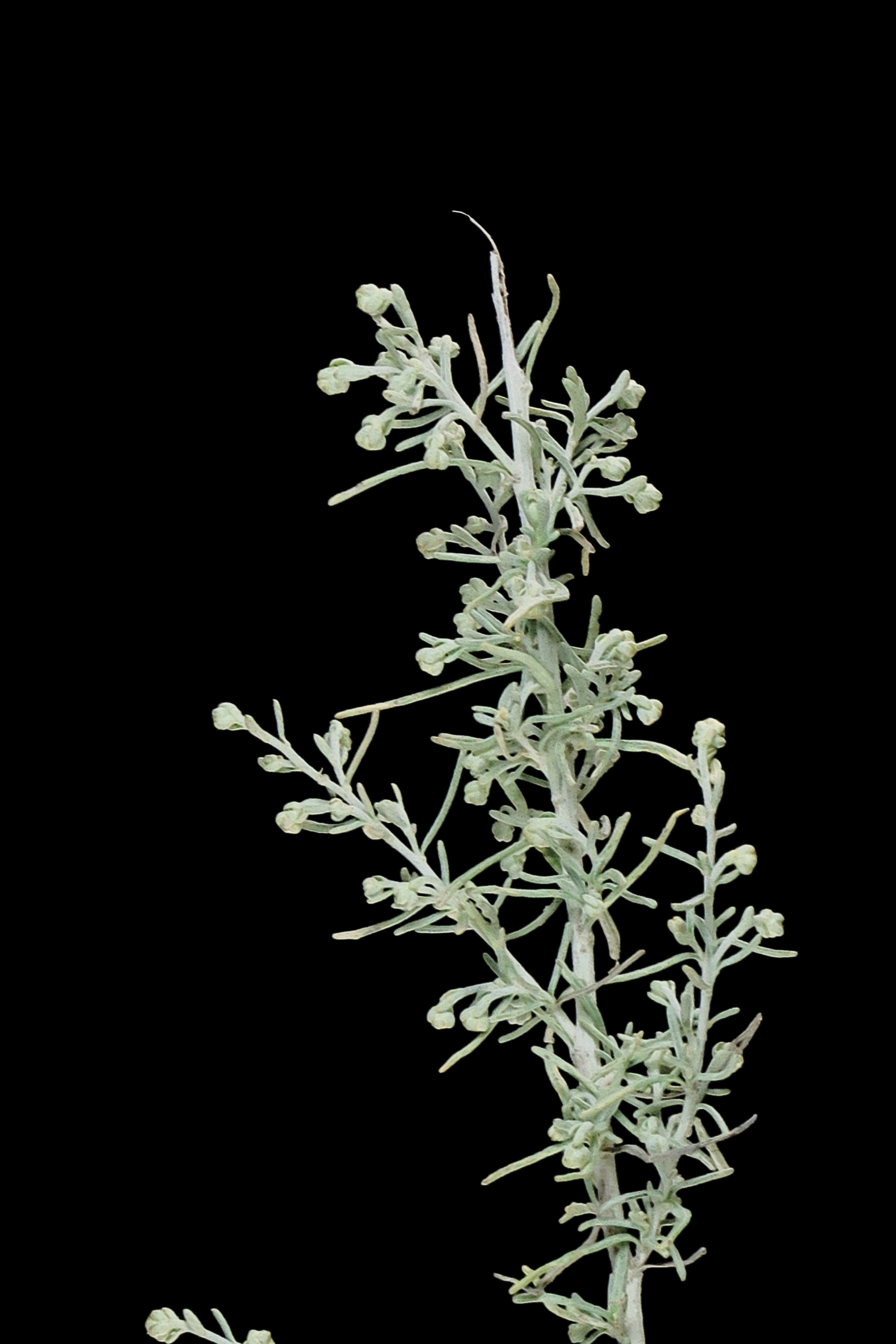
Close-up of mature foliage

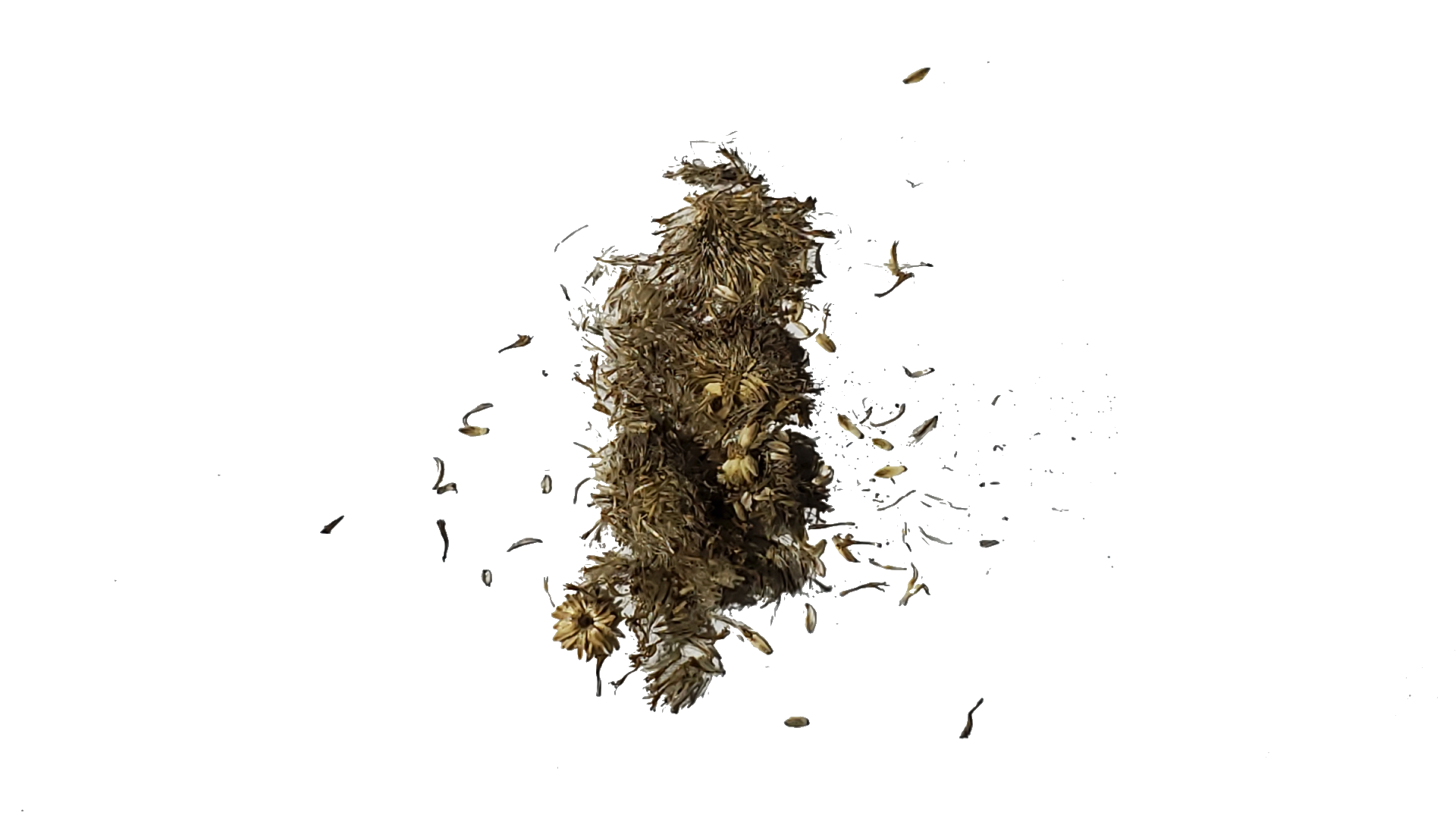
Seeds and spent pseudanthia of Artemisia californica

== Distribution and habitat ==
The shrub is native to western California and northwestern Baja California. It is endemic to the California chaparral and woodlands ecoregion, in coastal sage scrub, coastal strand, chaparral, and dry foothill communities. It is found from sea level to 800 m (2,600 ft) in elevation. This species is also found on many islands adjacent to the Baja California peninsula, including the Coronado Islands and Cedros Island. It is even found on Guadalupe Island, in the Pacific Ocean.

The prototypical plant association of A. californica is chaparral, notably in the California Coast Ranges; toyon and sage are also key components of communities which are transitional between chaparral and coastal sage scrub. It is often claimed to be allelopathic, secreting chemicals into the ground which inhibit other plants from growing near and around the shrub.

== Cultivation ==
This shrub is cultivated as an ornamental plant in native plant and wildlife gardens, natural landscaping design, and for restoration of disturbed sites and degraded coastal sage scrub. There are several lower height cultivars in the horticulture trade, for drought-tolerant groundcover use.

It thrives in full sun, preferring to grow on west or north-facing slopes. It needs little water and prefers no water in the summer months; it does not seem that soil types affect plant growth much. This plant relies on wildfire for seed germination and burned plants can crown-sprout and keep growing.

Animals rarely eat Artemisia californica, most likely due to the presence of bitter aromatic terpenes, but it provides good cover for smaller birds and other animals that can fit between its stems. It is an important habitat plant for the endangered California gnatcatcher.

== Uses ==
=== Indigenous uses ===
A. californica is known by several names to different Chumashan linguistic groups (Barbareño: we'wey; Cruzeño and Inseño: wewey; Obispeño: tilho; Ventureño: wewe'y). The Chumash used the plant for many recreational, ritual, and medicinal purposes. For example, wood from the stems was used to kindle fire by forming the horizontal piece of a fire drill, as the fore-shaft of arrows and as fuel for cooking. Branches were used as windbreaks and brush barricades; leaves/branches were used as incense and disinfectants for funeral rituals. The leaves were used in treating headaches by tying leaves to the forehead or by rubbing the leaves in water and wetting the hair and head with it; leaves were also carried inside hats to feel cooler. Boiled leaves were boiled and the steam was inhaled to treat paralysis. Decoctions were used to treat poison oak. The plant was also used to fumigate homes after funerals and bundles of the plant were erected during winter solstice ceremonies.

The Cahuilla employ A. californica as a treatment to fight coughs and colds by chewing the leaves, either dried or fresh. They also used it in girl's puberty rites; decoctions were drunk before each menstrual period accompanied by dietary restrictions. The decoction was also given to newborn babies a day after birth to purge their bodies. It is used by the Cahuilla and Tongva to alleviate menstrual cramps and to ease labor– the plant stimulates the uterine mucosa, which quickens childbirth. The Ohlone use it as a pain reliever by applying the leaves to teeth or tying them over wounds. Decoctions of the plant were used to bathe patients with colds, coughs, and rheumatism and taken internally to treat asthma along with back and chest poultices.

=== Medicinal ===
A. californica can be made into a decoction, and if taken regularly prior to menstruation, it relieves menstrual cramps and menopause. It can also be made into a tea bath to cure colds, coughs, and rheumatism, or a poultice to aid asthma. Its aromatic qualities make it valuable for incense and perfumes.

A. californica is also used to make a liniment that is a powerful pain reliever. The monoterpenoids in the plant interact with transient receptor potential cation channels to relieve pain. The plant also contains sesquiterpenes that may be involved in pain relief. The liniment is more powerful than opioid drugs and is much safer. A small amount of the liniment is applied where it is needed. Within 20 minutes, the pain subsides, even pain from broken bones, arthritis, sprains and strains.

== Conservation Issues & Efforts ==
California sagebrush and its natural habitat are threatened by exotic species, habitat fragmentation, and urban development. In recognition of the significance of Artemisia californica in preserving biodiversity, efforts are being made to conserve and restore the coastal sage scrub environment.

Numerous conservation initiatives have been started as a result of the California sagebrush's significance in coastal habitats. Projects aiming at preserving habitat and restoring the coastal sage scrub ecosystem are among them. These conservation activities must include invasive species management tactics, awareness-raising campaigns, and community involvement.

== See also ==
- List of California native plants
- Natural history of the California chaparral and woodlands
