= Ernestine Ygnacio-De Soto =

American author, cultural advisor, and nurse from California

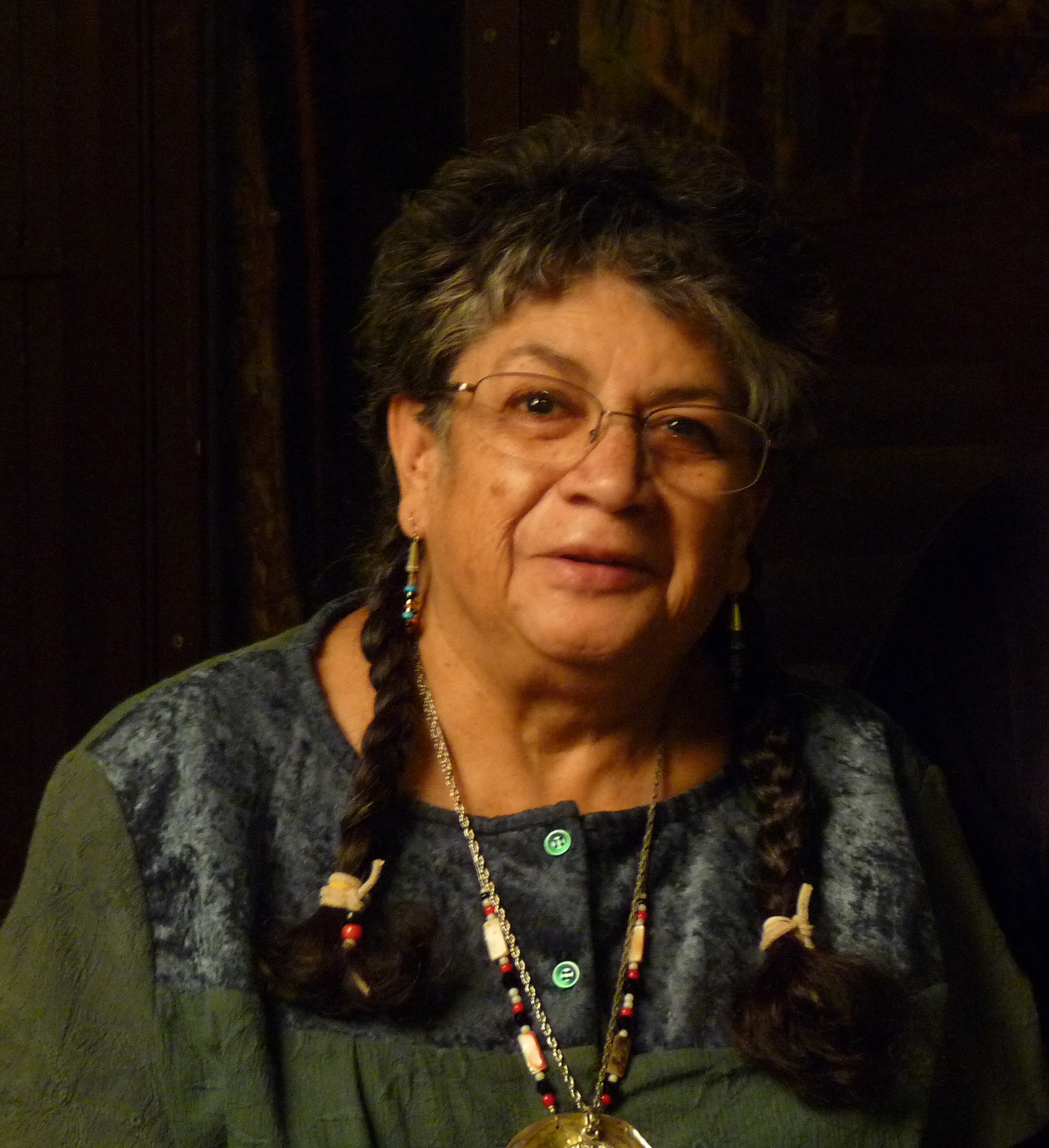
- Born: August 18, 1938; Santa Cruz, California, U.S.
- Died: January 29, 2026 (aged 87); Santa Barbara, California, U.S.
- Resting place: Mission Santa Barbara
- Occupations: cultural advisor, author, nurse
- Children: 5
- Mother: Mary Yee

Ernestine Ygnacio-De Soto (August 18, 1938 – January 29, 2026) was an author, cultural advisor, and former nurse of Barbareño Chumash descent. She was active in documenting the Barbareño Chumash language. Additionally, she worked as an illustrator and Chumash historian.

== Early life ==
Ygnacio-De Soto was born August 18, 1938 in Santa Cruz, California. She was the daughter of Mary Yee (1897–1965), who was the last first language speaker of the Chumashan language, Barbareño. She grew up listening to native speakers of the language and therefore served as a direct living link to that extinct language family.

Her ancestors lived near the area of Painted Cave, California. Some of her family stories, including stories by her maternal great grandmother Luisa Ygnacio, were documented by ethnologist John Peabody Harrington.

== Career ==
Ygnacio-De Soto has worked closely with archivist John Johnson for over a decade, in documenting family memories and Barbareño Chumash cultural traditions in to writing. They became friends when Johnson was writing his PhD thesis on Chumash marriage and family patterns.

Ygnacio-De Soto was the illustrator of a children's book which tells one of her mother's cultural stories, The Sugar Bear Story (2005), published by Sunbelt Publications in conjunction with the Anthropology Department of the Santa Barbara Museum of Natural History.

In 2009, she helped to co-write a documentary film script with John R. Johnson. The film, 6 Generations: A Chumash Family's History (2010) is about her family's history and was produced by filmmaker Paul Goldsmith. It has been reviewed in the Journal of California and Great Basin Anthropology. The 6 Generations film won several awards at the Archaeology Channel International Film and Video Festival (2012); including Best Film; Best Script; Special Mention, Increasing the Awareness of the Ethnographic Record; and Audience Favorite.

She spoke out in 2019 against a project by the Bacara Resort in Santa Barbara, which aimed to build bathrooms in an area that holds sacred Chumash graves.

The United States National Park Service has devoted a web page to her commentary on Scott O'Dell's book, Island of the Blue Dolphins (1960), in Chapter 7.

Additionally, she has worked as a nurse at a Santa Barbara rest home.

== Publications ==
- Yee, Mary J. (2005). The Sugar Bear Story. Ernestine Ygnacio De Soto (illustrator). San Diego, CA: Sunbelt Publications. ISBN 9780932653703.

== See also ==
- Barbareño language
