= KSZN =

KSZN could refer to:

- Santa Cruz Island Airport (ICAO code KSZN), an airport on Santa Cruz Island in Santa Barbara County, California, United States
- KSZN-LP, a low-power radio station (101.5 FM) licensed to serve Flagstaff, Arizona, United States
- KRYN, a radio station (1230 AM) licensed to serve Gresham, Oregon, United States, licensed as "KSZN" from 2007 to 2009
- KOOR, a radio station (1010 AM) licensed to serve Milwaukie, Oregon, United States, licensed as "KSZN" from 2006 to 2007
- KPDN (AM), a defunct radio station formerly licensed to serve Pampa, Texas, United States, licensed as "KSZN" from 1982 to 1988
