= Island Chumash language =

Extinct Chumashan language of California

Island Chumash
- Isleño, Cruzeño
- Native to: California, United States
- Region: Santa Cruz Island, Santa Rosa Island, San Miguel Island
- Ethnicity: Island Chumash
- Extinct: June 19, 1915, with the death of Fernando Librado
- Language family: Chumashan: Southern; Island Chumash
- Dialects: Cruzeño; Roseño; Migueleño

Language codes
- ISO 639-3: crz
- Glottolog: cruz1243
- Cruzeño

- Island Chumash is classified as Extinct by the UNESCO Atlas of the World's Languages in Danger.

Island Chumash, also known as Isleño (Ysleño) or by the dialect name Cruzeño, is one of the extinct Chumashan languages spoken along the coastal areas of Southern California.

== Lexicon ==
It shows evidence of mixing between a core Chumashan language such as Barbareño or Ventureño and an indigenous language of the Channel Islands. The latter was presumably spoken on the islands since the end of the last ice age separated them from the mainland; Chumash would have been introduced in the first millennium after the introduction of plank canoes on the mainland. Evidence of the substratum language is retained in a noticeably non-Chumash phonology, and basic non-Chumash words such as those for 'water' and 'house'.
