= Chionodes trichostola =

Scientific classification
- Kingdom: Animalia
- Phylum: Arthropoda
- Clade: Pancrustacea
- Class: Insecta
- Order: Lepidoptera
- Family: Gelechiidae
- Genus: Chionodes
- Species: C. trichostola

Binomial name
- Chionodes trichostola (Meyrick, 1923)

Synonyms
- Gelechia trichostola Meyrick, 1923

Species of moth

Chionodes trichostola is a moth in the family Gelechiidae. It is found in North America, where it has been recorded from south-western British Columbia to California, Utah, Colorado, Arizona and Texas.

The wingspan is about 19 mm for males and 16 mm for females. The forewings are brown irregularly suffused with rather dark fuscous irroration and with a small blackish linear mark beneath the costa near the base. There is an elongate black spot on the base of the dorsum and an oblique streak from the costa to the plical stigma, obscurely indicated by dark suffusion with two small spots of blackish suffusion. The stigmata are cloudy, blackish, with the plical very obliquely before the first discal which tends to form an oblique mark. There are two or three whitish scales beyond this and before the second and there is also an angulated transverse streak of brown ground colour at three-fourths. The hindwings are grey.

The larvae feed on Quercus chrysolepis, Quercus douglasii, Quercus kelloggii, Quercus lobata, Quercus wislizenii, Quercus dumosa, Quercus tomentella, Arctostaphylos insularis and Sorbus species.
