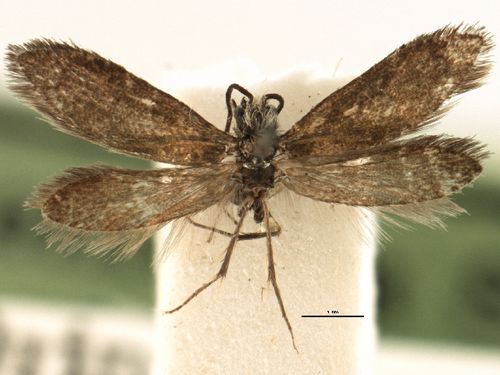

Scientific classification
- Kingdom: Animalia
- Phylum: Arthropoda
- Clade: Pancrustacea
- Class: Insecta
- Order: Lepidoptera
- Family: Eriocraniidae
- Genus: Eriocraniella
- Species: E. aurosparsella

Binomial name
- Eriocraniella aurosparsella (Walsingham, 1880)

Synonyms
- Micropteryx aurosparsella Walsingham, 1880; Eriocephala aurosparsella (Walsingham, 1880); Mnemonica aurosparsella (Walsingham, 1880)

= Eriocraniella aurosparsella =

Moth species in family Eriocraniidae

Eriocraniella aurosparsella is a moth of the family Eriocraniidae. It was described by Thomas de Grey in 1880. It is found in the Western United States from southern Oregon south through the California Coast Ranges to Santa Clara County and Santa Cruz Island.

== Description ==
The wingspan is 8–9 mm for males and 7.5–8.5 mm for females. The forewings are immaculate, brownish fuscous, usually with a distinct bronzy to light purplish iridescence. The hindwings are similar to the forewings though less lustrous. They are uniformly covered with relatively broad scales. Adults are on wing from late February to late May in one generation per year.

The larvae feed on Quercus kelloggii. They mine the leaves of their host plant. The mine is elongate and linear at first. It follows the leaf margin for a short distance and then abruptly enlarges to form a large, full-depth blotch. The larvae have a dark brown body and a uniformly dark brown head.
