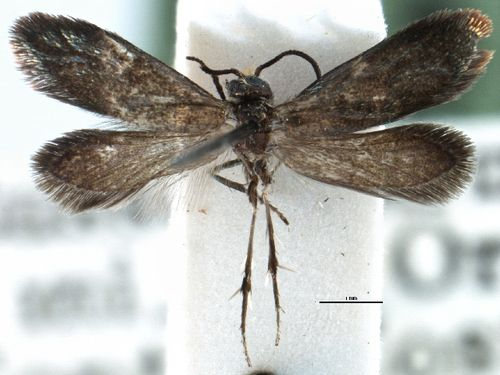

Scientific classification
- Kingdom: Animalia
- Phylum: Arthropoda
- Clade: Pancrustacea
- Class: Insecta
- Order: Lepidoptera
- Family: Eriocraniidae
- Genus: Eriocraniella
- Species: E. xanthocara

Binomial name
- Eriocraniella xanthocara Davis, 1978

= Eriocraniella xanthocara =

Moth species in family Eriocraniidae

Eriocraniella xanthocara is a moth of the family Eriocraniidae. It was described by Donald R. Davis in 1978. It is found in California from Shasta County south at least to Santa Clara County and Santa Cruz Island.

== Description ==
The wingspan is 7–8 mm for males and 7.5–8.5 mm for females. The forewings are immaculate, dark fuscous with a prominent greenish blue iridescence. The hindwings are similar to the forewings in color though less lustrous and with more purplish iridescence. They are uniformly covered with relatively broad scales. Adults are on wing from early March to late April in one generation per year.

The larvae feed on Quercus agrifolia and Quercus wislizenii. They mine the leaves of their host plant. They have a brownish body and a uniformly light brown to stramineous head.
