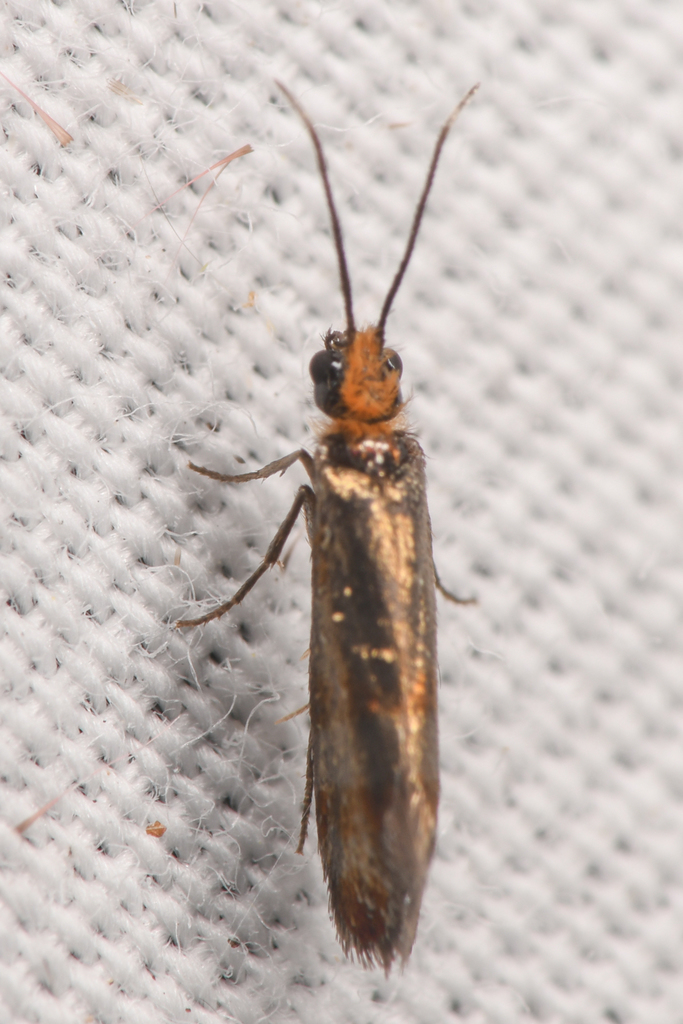

Scientific classification
- Kingdom: Animalia
- Phylum: Arthropoda
- Class: Insecta
- Order: Lepidoptera
- Family: Eriocraniidae
- Genus: Eriocraniella
- Species: E. variegata

Binomial name
- Eriocraniella variegata Davis, 1978

= Eriocraniella variegata =

Moth species in family Eriocraniidae

Eriocraniella variegata is a moth of the family Eriocraniidae. It was described by Donald R. Davis in 1978. It is found in the San Gabriel Mountains, California.

== Description ==
The wingspan is 8.2–9.5 mm for males and 7.8–8.7 mm for females. The forewings are irregularly and almost equally marked with iridescent gold and purplish fuscous. The markings are typically in the form of transverse bands across the wing but are sometimes fragmented into large irregular spots. The hindwings are usually slightly darker and less lustrous than the forewings though usually with a slight purplish iridescence near the apex. The scales are relatively broad. Adults are on wing in May in one generation per year. The host plant is unknown.
