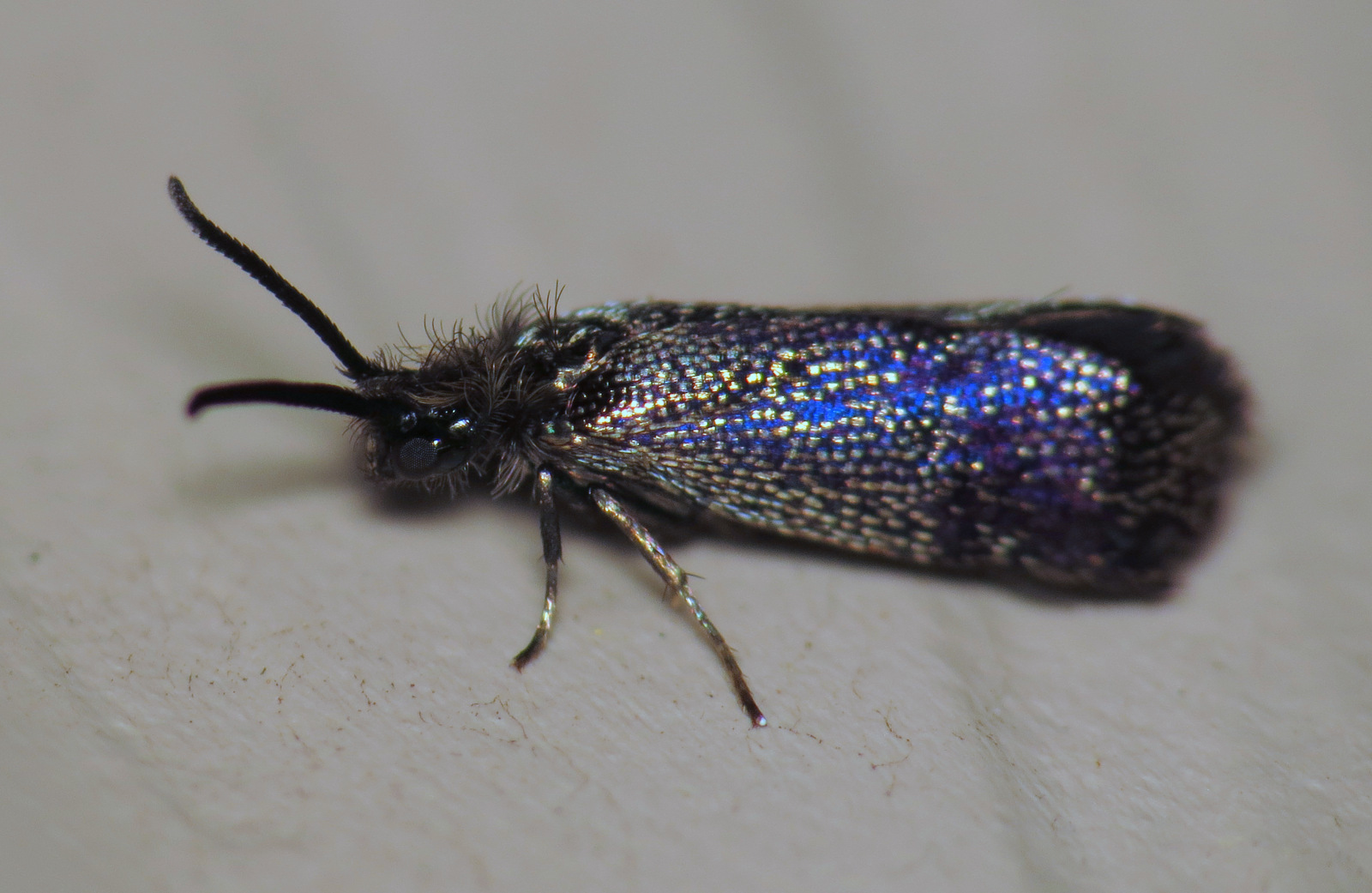
- Eriocraniella platyptera

Scientific classification
- Domain: Eukaryota
- Kingdom: Animalia
- Phylum: Arthropoda
- Class: Insecta
- Order: Lepidoptera
- Family: Eriocraniidae
- Genus: Eriocraniella; Viette, 1949

Species
- 8 species (see text)

= Eriocraniella =

Moth genus in family Eriocraniidae

Eriocraniella is a genus of moths in the family Eriocraniidae. The genus is distributed in the Nearctic.

Eriocraniella are small moths (wingspan 6–10 mm (0.24–0.39 in)) with relatively broad wings.

== Species ==
There are eight species in two subgenera:

- Subgenus Eriocraniella Viette, 1949
  - Eriocraniella aurosparsella (Walsingham, 1880)
  - Eriocraniella longifurcula Davis, 1978
  - Eriocraniella platyptera Davis, 1978
  - Eriocraniella xanthocara Davis, 1978
- Subgenus Disfurcula Davis, 1978
  - Eriocraniella falcata Davis, 1978
  - Eriocraniella mediabulla Davis & Faeth, 1986
  - Eriocraniella trigona Davis, 1978
  - Eriocraniella variegata Davis, 1978
