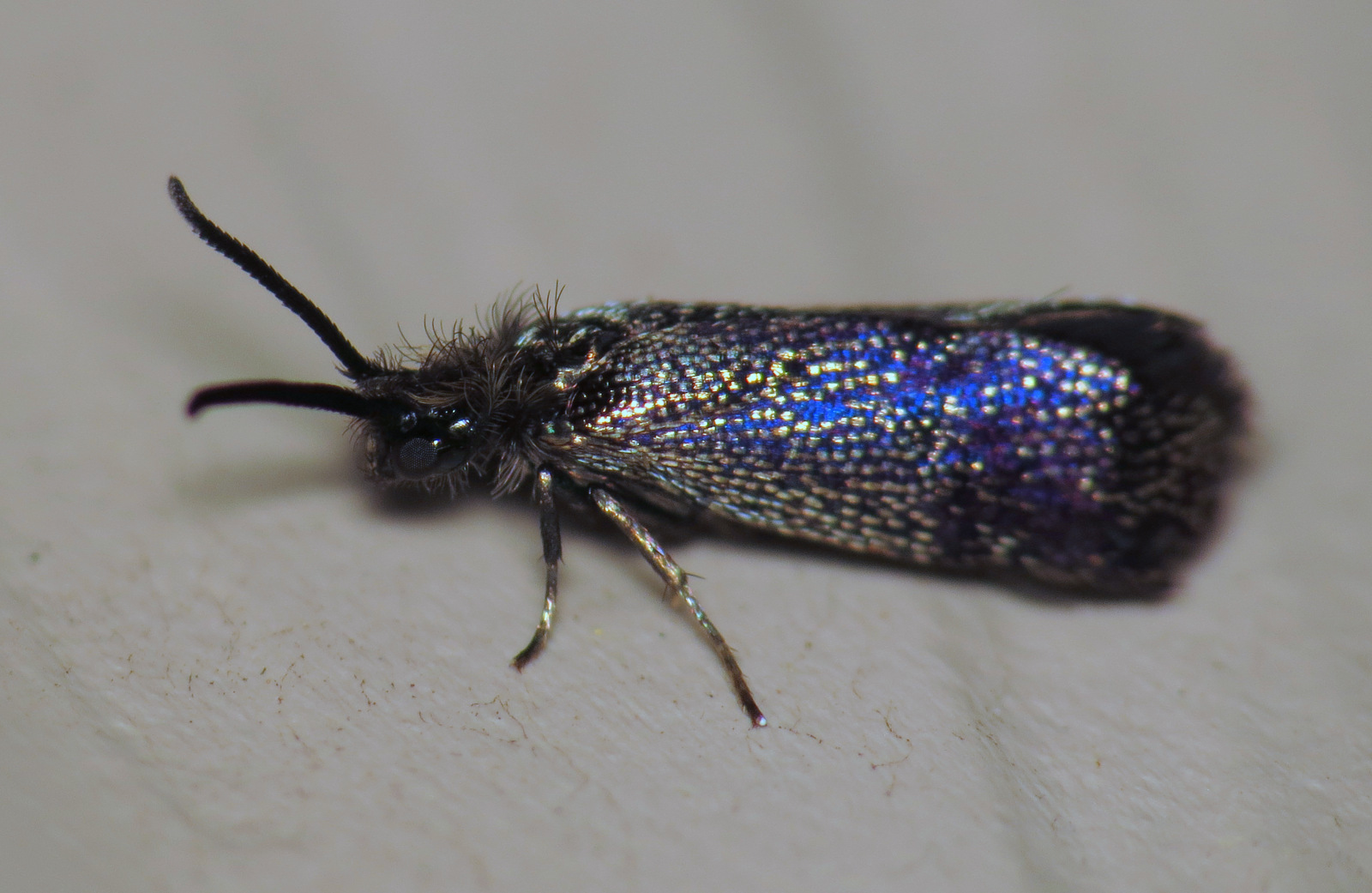

Scientific classification
- Kingdom: Animalia
- Phylum: Arthropoda
- Class: Insecta
- Order: Lepidoptera
- Family: Eriocraniidae
- Genus: Eriocraniella
- Species: E. platyptera

Binomial name
- Eriocraniella platyptera Davis, 1978

= Eriocraniella platyptera =

Moth species in family Eriocraniidae

Eriocraniella platyptera is a moth of the family Eriocraniidae. It was described by Donald R. Davis in 1978. It is found in the Northeastern and Southern United States, from north-western New York to Texas.

== Description ==
The wingspan is 7.8–8.2 mm for males and about 8.2 mm for females. The forewings are relatively broad and immaculate dark fuscous with a prominent golden brassy to blue green iridescence. The hindwings are much paler, grayish fuscous with a slight purplish luster. The scales are moderately broad. Adults are on wing in May in one generation per year. The larvae are leaf miners of oaks, including Quercus ilicifolia.
