= Mary Yee =

American linguist

Mary Joachina Yee
- Born: Mary Joachina Ygnacio Rowe; 1897; Near Santa Barbara, California, U.S.
- Died: 1965 (aged 67–68)
- Other name: Mary J. Rowe
- Citizenship: Chumash, United States
- Occupation: Linguist
- Known for: Last first-language speaker of the Barbareño language
- Children: Valentina Yee, Josie Yee, John Yee, Angela Yee, and Ernestine Ygnacio-De Soto
- Parent: Lucretia García (mother)
- Relatives: Luisa Ygnacio (grandmother)

Mary Joachina Yee (née Ygnacio Rowe; 1897–1965) was a Barbareño Chumash linguist. She was the last first-language speaker of the Barbareño language, a member of the Chumashan languages that were once spoken in southern California by the Chumash people.

== Biography ==
Mary Rowe-Yee was born in 1897 in an adobe house near Santa Barbara, California, the home of her grandmother. In the late 1890s, Mary was one of only a handful of children brought up to speak any Chumash language. She memorized several old Chumash stories.

In her fifties, Mary Yee began to take part in the analysis, description, and documentation of her language, for many years working closely with the linguist John Peabody Harrington, who had also worked with Mary's mother Lucretia García and her grandmother Luisa Ygnacio. Yee and Harrington corresponded with each other in Chumash. After retiring in 1954, Yee worked with Harrington nearly every day. She also worked with linguist Madison S. Beeler. Over the course of her work she became a linguist in her own right, analyzing paradigms and word structure.

Yee's story appears in the documentary film, 6 Generations: A Chumash Family History (2010) which was co-written by her daughter Ernestine Ygnacio-De Soto. Posthumously, she published a children's book, The Sugar Bear Story (2005), illustrated by Ygnacio-De Soto.

== Publication ==
- Yee, Mary J. (2005). "Introduction". The Sugar Bear Story. illustrated by Ernestine Ygnacio-De Soto. San Diego: Sunbelt Publications in cooperation with the Santa Barbara Museum of Natural History. ISBN 978-0-932653-70-3. LCCN 2005003047.

== See also ==
- List of last known speakers of languages
