= Santa Cruz Island horse =

Horse breed

The Santa Cruz Island Horse was a feral horse on Santa Cruz Island, descended from horses originally brought by Spanish settlers in 1830. Horses were removed from the island in 1998. In 1999, a breeding program was started to conserve the breed.

The horses are bred at El Campeon Farms in Thousand Oaks, California, until today.
