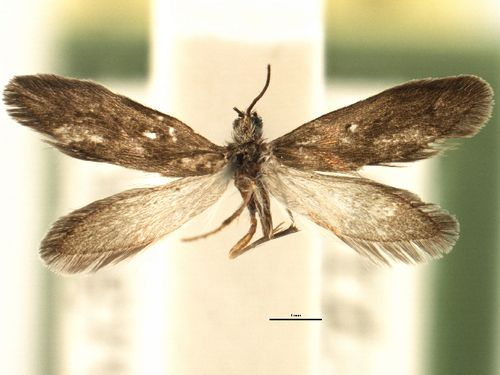

Scientific classification
- Kingdom: Animalia
- Phylum: Arthropoda
- Class: Insecta
- Order: Lepidoptera
- Family: Eriocraniidae
- Genus: Eriocraniella
- Species: E. longifurcula

Binomial name
- Eriocraniella longifurcula Davis, 1978

= Eriocraniella longifurcula =

Moth species in family Eriocraniidae

Eriocraniella longifurcula is a moth of the family Eriocraniidae. It was described by Donald R. Davis in 1978. It is found in central Arizona.

== Description ==
The wingspan is 9.5–10 mm for males. The forewings are relatively slender and immaculate, fuscous with a slight bluish purple iridescence. The hindwings are slightly paler than the forewings, grayish, uniformly covered with relatively broad scales. Adults are on wing in May, probably in one generation per year.

The larvae possibly feed on Fagaceae (Quercus) species. They have a dark brown body and a uniformly light brown to stramineous head.
