= Justinian Caire =

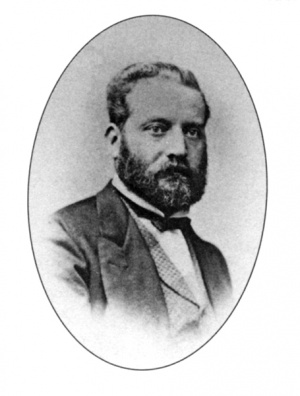
- Born: December 3, 1827; Briançon, Hautes-Alpes
- Died: December 10, 1897 (aged 70); Oakland, California

Justinian Caire (born December 3, 1827 in Briançon – December 10, 1897 in Oakland) was a French immigrant and founder of a successful San Francisco business that sold equipment to miners. By the late 1880s, Caire had acquired all of the shares of the Santa Cruz Island Company founded in 1869. He was nominally the owner of the Santa Cruz island until his death in 1897.

== Personal life ==
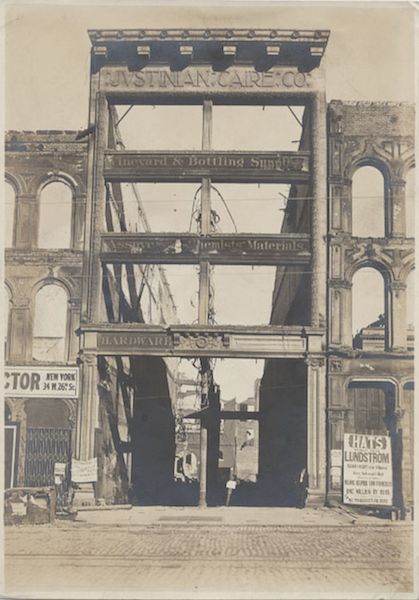
Ruins of the Justinian Caire Co. building, 565 Market St.after the San Francisco earthquake and fireApril 21, 1906

Justinian Caire was born into the family of Jean Pierre Cayre and Marie Anne Adelaide Arduin. With his wife, Albina, he had nine children. Was buried in St. Mary's Cemetery in Oakland, California.

== Career ==
Justinian Caire was raised and educated in Briançon. In 1846, at the age of 19, he moved to Genoa where he enrolled in a commercial school and studied Italian and commerce. In 1851, Cayre arrived in San Francisco as a merchant. In 1852, with Claude Long, he founded Caire & Long. In 1856, Caire and Long separated ways and the company became Caire Brothers.

In 1860, Caire became a director of the French Bank. In 1869 he was one of the ten original incorporators of the Santa Cruz Island Company, formed to purchase the island from William Eustace Barron. In 1869, a syndicate of San Francisco businessmen purchased Santa Cruz Island, with the intent of developing a ranching venture called the Santa Cruz Island Company. By 1888, Justinian Caire had bought out all shares of this venture.

In February 1997, the National Park Service acquired the Caire's family final interest.
