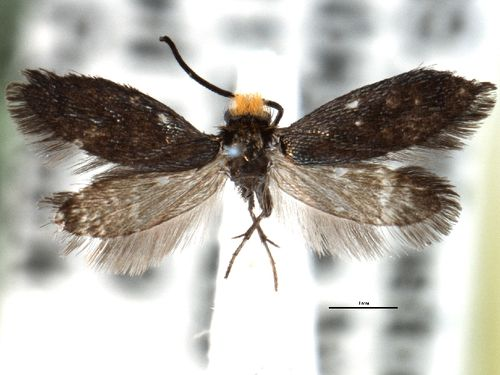

Scientific classification
- Kingdom: Animalia
- Phylum: Arthropoda
- Class: Insecta
- Order: Lepidoptera
- Family: Eriocraniidae
- Genus: Eriocraniella
- Species: E. trigona

Binomial name
- Eriocraniella trigona Davis, 1978

= Eriocraniella trigona =

Moth species in family Eriocraniidae

Eriocraniella trigona is a moth of the family Eriocraniidae. It was described by Donald R. Davis in 1978. It is found in the San Gabriel Mountains, California.

== Description ==
The wingspan is 6–8 mm. The forewings and fringe are uniformly fuscous with a bronzy to purplish iridescence. The hindwings are paler in color, more grayish and less iridescent and the scales are moderately broad. Adults are on wing in mid May in one generation per year. The host plant is unknown.
