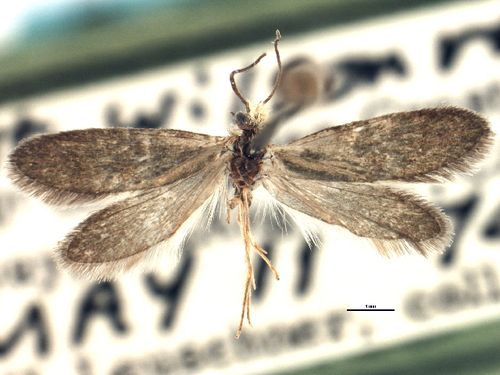

Scientific classification
- Kingdom: Animalia
- Phylum: Arthropoda
- Clade: Pancrustacea
- Class: Insecta
- Order: Lepidoptera
- Family: Eriocraniidae
- Genus: Eriocraniella
- Species: E. falcata

Binomial name
- Eriocraniella falcata Davis, 1978

= Eriocraniella falcata =

Moth species in family Eriocraniidae

Eriocraniella falcata is a moth of the family Eriocraniidae. It was described by Donald R. Davis in 1978. It is found in the Coast Ranges of central California.

== Description ==
The wingspan is 7–10 mm for both males and females. The forewings are uniformly bronzy brown, often with a pale golden luster. The hindwings are slightly darker than the forewings and less iridescent, but with a slight purplish luster, becoming darker toward the outer margins. The scales are relatively broad, particularly over the outer half. Adults are on wing from late March to mid May in one generation per year.

The larvae feed on Quercus chrysolepis. They mine the leaves of their host plant. The early instar linear mine is unusually long. The mine continues to the leaf margin and then abruptly enlarges to form a full depth blotch usually covering the apical third to one-fifth of the leaf.
