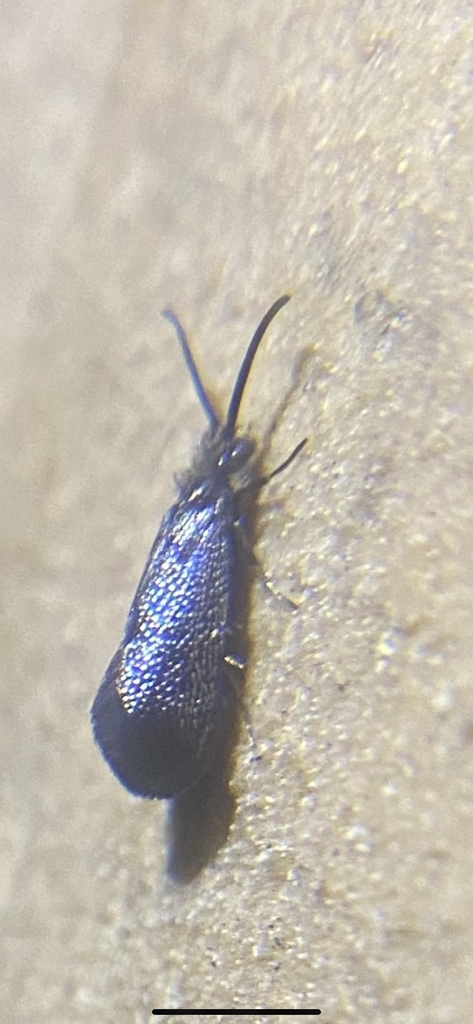

Scientific classification
- Domain: Eukaryota
- Kingdom: Animalia
- Phylum: Arthropoda
- Class: Insecta
- Order: Lepidoptera
- Family: Eriocraniidae
- Genus: Eriocraniella
- Species: E. mediabulla

Binomial name
- Eriocraniella mediabulla Davis & Faeth, 1986

= Eriocraniella mediabulla =

Moth species in family Eriocraniidae

Eriocraniella mediabulla is a moth of the family Eriocraniidae. It was described by Donald R. Davis and Stanley H. Faeth in 1986. It is found along the Atlantic and Gulf coastal plain from north-eastern Texas, Louisiana, to Florida, Georgia, and North Carolina.

== Description ==
The length of the forewings is 3.8–4.1 mm for males and 3.3–3.7 mm for females. The forewings are uniformly black with a distinct golden to sometimes bluish luster. The hindwings are slightly paler and fuscous with a distinct purplish luster along the costal half. Adults are on wing from early March to mid April in one generation per year.

The larvae feed on Quercus nigra and possibly Quercus falcata, Quercus alba, Quercus hemisphaerica and Quercus virginiana, and several other oaks. They mine the leaves of their host plant. The mine starts as a serpentine mine in the upper epidermis of the leaf, proceeding along the leaf edge to the apical portion of the leaf where a full-depth, blotch-shaped mine is produced. Full-grown larvae cut a hole in the lower leaf surface and drop to the soil surface. There, they burrow into the soil and spin a cocoon.

== Etymology ==
The specific name is derived from Latin media (meaning middle) and bulla (meaning knob) and refers to the diagnostic midventral, knoblike process on the vinculum of the male.
