= Santa Cruz Island Airport =

- IATA: SZN; ICAO: KSZN; FAA LID: SZN

Summary
- Airport type: Private
- Owner: The Nature Conservancy
- Location: Santa Cruz Island, California
- Elevation AMSL: 50 ft / 15 m
- Coordinates: 34°03′38″N 119°54′54″W

Map
- Location of airport in California

Runways
Direction	Length		Surface
Direction	ft	m	Surface
9/27	2,150	655	Dirt
- Source: Federal Aviation Administration

Santa Cruz Island Airport (IATA: SZN, ICAO: KSZN, FAA LID: SZN) is a former airstrip on Santa Cruz Island in Santa Barbara County, California, United States. It is located 24 nautical miles (28 mi, 44 km) southwest of the City of Santa Barbara. This airport was owned by The Nature Conservancy but is no longer registered. It is not to be confused with Christy Airstrip (FAA LID: CA97) or Santa Cruz Ranch Airport (FAA LID: 44CA), the currently active airstrips on Santa Cruz Island and also owned by The Nature Conservancy.

== Facilities ==
Santa Cruz Island Airport resides at elevation of 50 feet (15 m) above mean sea level. It has one runway designated 9/27 with a dirt surface measuring 2,150 by 50 feet (655 x 15 m).
