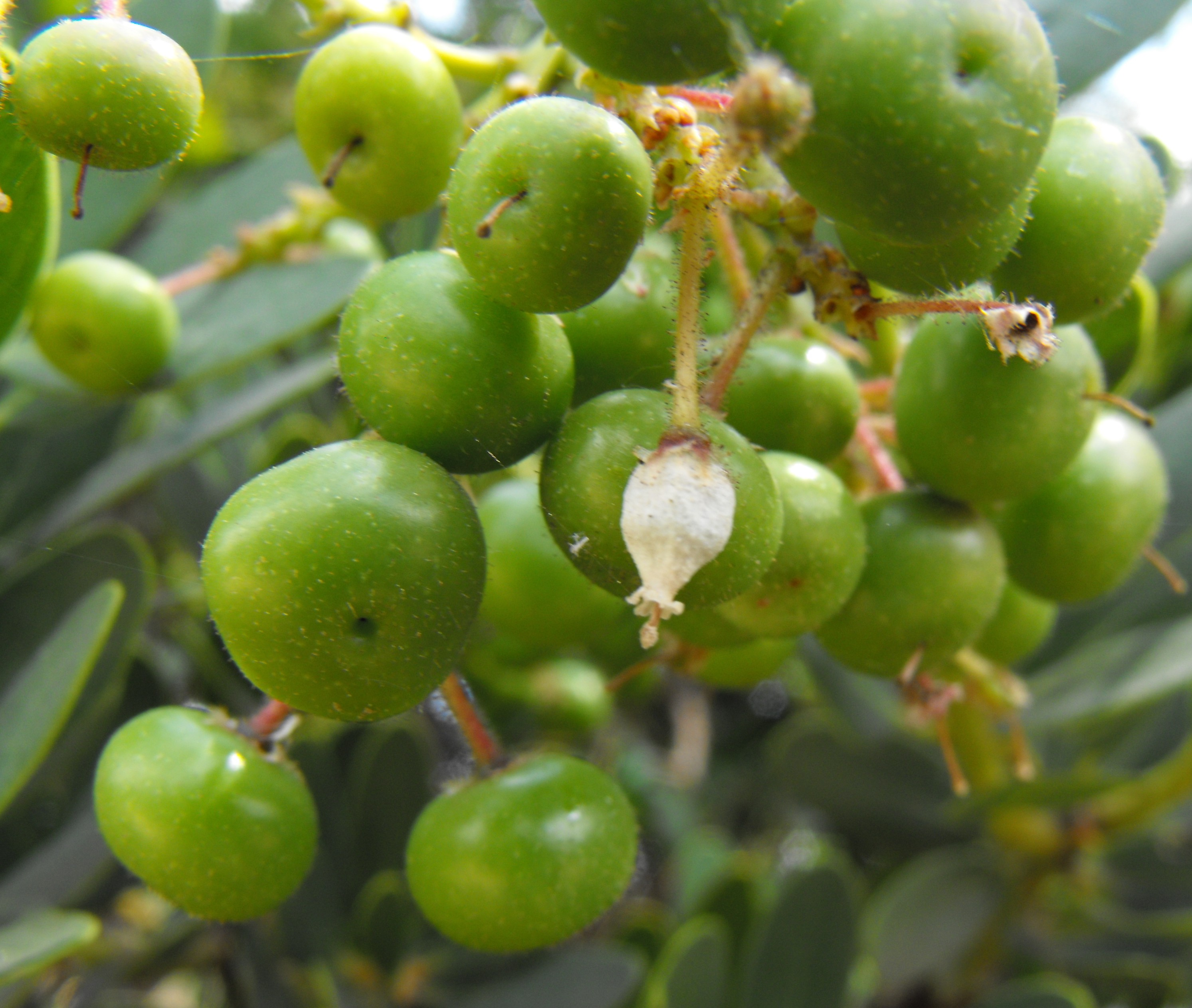
- unripe fruits

Conservation status
- Apparently Secure (NatureServe)

Scientific classification
- Kingdom: Plantae
- Clade: Tracheophytes
- Clade: Angiosperms
- Clade: Eudicots
- Clade: Asterids
- Order: Ericales
- Family: Ericaceae
- Genus: Arctostaphylos
- Species: A. insularis

Binomial name
- Arctostaphylos insularis Greene ex Parry

= Arctostaphylos insularis =

Island manzanita

Species of flowering plant

Arctostaphylos insularis is a species of manzanita known by the common name island manzanita. It is endemic to Santa Cruz Island, one of the Channel Islands of California.

== Description ==
Arctostaphylos insularis is a large, spreading shrub reaching over 2 metres (6 ft 7 in) tall and known to exceed 5 metres (16 ft 5 in) in width. It has waxy, reddish bark and the smaller twigs sometimes have bristly glandular hairs. The leaves are shiny green and smooth, generally oval in shape and slightly convex, and up to about 4.5 centimetres (1 3/4 in) long. The shrub blooms in many dense clustered inflorescences of urn-shaped flowers. The fruit is an orange-brown drupe up to 1.5 centimetres (5/8 in) wide.

== Habitat ==
Arctostaphylos insularis grows in the chaparral, oak woodland, and coastal pine forest habitat of its native island.

== See also ==
- California chaparral and woodlands
- California coastal sage and chaparral ecoregion
