= Ventureño language =

Extinct Chumashan language of California

Ventureño
- Mitsqanaqa'n mitsqanaqan̓
- Pronunciation: [mitsqanaqan̰]
- Native to: United States
- Region: Southern Californian coastal areas
- Extinct: mid-20th century
- Language family: Chumashan: Southern; Central; Ventureño

Language codes
- ISO 639-3: veo
- Glottolog: vent1242
- Ventureño is classified as Extinct by the UNESCO Atlas of the World's Languages in Danger.

Ventureño is a member of the extinct Chumashan languages, a group of Native American languages previously spoken by the Chumash people along the coastal areas of Southern California from as far north as San Luis Obispo to as far south as Malibu. Ventureño was spoken from as far north as present-day Ventura to as far south as present-day Malibu and the Simi Hills, California. Dialects probably also included Castac and Alliklik.

Ventureño is, like its sister Chumashan languages, a polysynthetic language, having larger words composed of a number of morphemes. Ventureño has separate word classes of verb, noun, and oblique adjunct; with no separate word class for adjectives or adpositions. Nouns and verbs are often heavily affixed (mostly prefixed) in Ventureño, affixing being a way to denote those meanings often conveyed by separate words in more analytic languages. Verbs play a primary role in Ventureño with utterances often composed only of a verb with clitics. Chumash word order is VSO/VOS, or VS/VO.

== Phonology ==
Ventureño has a similar phonemic inventory to other Chumash languages. Ventureño consists of 30 consonants and 6 vowels.

=== Vowels ===
Ventureño consists of a regular 5-vowel inventory with a sixth vowel transcribed as ⟨ə⟩. In Barbareño transcriptions, ⟨ɨ⟩ is used. It is not known whether these two phones are the same in both languages (and the difference in transcription merely one of convention), or whether the sounds were in fact different enough for Harrington to use different symbols.

	Front	Central	Back
Close	i	ə	u
Mid	e	ə	o
Open		a	

=== Consonants ===
		Bilabial	Alveolar		Postalveolar/ Palatal	Velar	Uvular	Glottal
		Bilabial	plain	sibilant	Postalveolar/ Palatal	Velar	Uvular	Glottal
Plosive/ Affricate	plain	p	t	t͡s	t͡ʃ	k	q	ʔ
Plosive/ Affricate	ejective	pʼ	tʼ	t͡sʼ	t͡ʃʼ	kʼ	qʼ	ʔ
Plosive/ Affricate	aspirated	pʰ	tʰ	t͡sʰ	t͡ʃʰ	kʰ	qʰ	ʔ
Fricative	plain			s	ʃ	x		h
Fricative	aspirated			sʰ	ʃʰ			
Lateral			l (ɬ)^{1}					
Sonorant	plain	m	n		j	w		
Sonorant	creaky voice	m̰	n̰		j̰	w̰		

1. Ventureño has only one lateral, /l/. However, /l/ has a distinct allophone [ɬ] that Harrington includes in his transcriptions.

==== /N/ ====
Some morphemes in Ventureño have a final /n/ in certain environments, but not in others, sometimes alternating with /ʔ/ in word-final position. The status of this variable n is difficult to interpret. Ingo Mamot proposes the use of /N/ to capture this variation between /n/, /∅/, and /ʔ/, though they consider this to be not a completely satisfying approach as /n/ and /N/ are not distinctive.

== Orthography ==
Ventureño has been written in several different ways by different linguists. John Peabody Harrington, who compiled most of the data on Ventureño, used a modified version of the International Phonetic Alphabet. Harrington differed from the International Phonetic Alphabet in the following symbols: a kappa ⟨к⟩ (small-cap 'k') for [q], a ⟨q⟩ for [x], a slanted bar ⟨ł⟩ for [ɬ], a reversed apostrophe ⟨‘⟩ for aspiration, and a right-turned (standard) apostrophe ⟨ʼ⟩ for a glottal stop (this symbol was also used for ejectives and glottalized sonorants).

The Barbareño/Ventureño Band of Mission Indians has adopted an Americanist form of transcription for Ventureño based on the work done by Harrington: ⟨š⟩ for [ʃ], ⟨ł⟩ for [ɬ], ⟨x⟩ for [x], ⟨ʰ⟩ for aspiration, ⟨y⟩ for [j], and ⟨q⟩ for [q]. A standard apostrophe ⟨ʼ⟩ continues to be used for a glottal stop [ʔ] and for denoting ejectives. Glottalized sonorants [m̰, n̰, w̰, j̰] are written with a combining apostrophe over the symbol ⟨m̓⟩, ⟨n̓⟩, ⟨w̓⟩, ⟨y̓⟩. This transcription is in keeping with most current Chumashists (such as Wash below) except that alveolar affricates ([t͡s]) are written as ⟨ts⟩ in Ventureño, where other Chumashists write them as ⟨c⟩. Likewise, Ventureño writes postalveolar affricates ([t͡ʃ]) as ⟨tš⟩, where other Chumashists write this sound as ⟨č⟩.

== Morphology ==
Ventureño morphology is fairly polysynthetic. This applies especially to the verbs of the language, which has over 15 distinct morphological slots (when counting nominalized verbs). This is illustrated in the table below by the nominalized verb meaning "your wanting to make fun of us".

lo- si- p- ʔal- suya- su- qoniš -pi -iyiyuw
DEM- ART- 2- NZ- DES- CAUS- {make fun of} -APL.LOC -1PL.REDUP
"your wanting to make fun of us"

=== Pronouns ===
Pronominal prefixes mark the subject of the verb and possession on the noun.

Pronominal prefixes
	singular	dual	plural	indefinite
1st	k-	k-iš-	k-iy-	
2nd	p-	p-iš-	p-iy-	
3rd	ts-	ts-iš-	ts-iy-	ts-am-

Independent personal pronouns Ventureño are sparsely attested. The third person may also be expressed with demonstratives.

Independent personal pronouns
	singular	dual	plural
1st	no	kiškə	kikə
2nd	pi	piškə	pikə
3rd	kay	kaywuN	

Demonstrative pronouns
	singular	plural
proximal	heʼ	heʼwun
distal	kaki	kakiwun

=== Nouns ===
The template for simple nouns is as follows:

prefixes					stem	suffixes		
-5	-4	-3	-2	-1	0	+1	+2	+3
Deixis	Nominal status	Possession		Number	stem	Derivational suffixes		Number

==== Noun phrases ====
Ventureño noun phrases can be formed by combining a head noun with either a proclitic article, a modifier, or a modifying noun.

The articles in Ventureño are si= which can be interpreted as a general marker and does not express definiteness, and hal= which marks the irrealis mood. Both of these proclitics can be used as nominalizers.

si= ʼəwə
ART knife
"the knife"

ʼ- axakš -it hal= p- nə
ʼ give 1SG IRR.ART 2SG fire
"Give me a fire!"

=== Verbs ===
The template for simple nouns is as follows:

prefixes										stem	suffixes						
-10	-9	-8	-7	-6	-5	-4	-3	-2	-1	0	+1	+2	+3	+4	+5	+6	+7
Mood			Aspect		Tense	Subject person	Subject number	Prefixal derivation		stem	Verbalization	Spatial orientation	Benefactive	Object person/number, reflexive, valency	Aktionsart	Tense	Question

Objects of verbs are marked with suffixes.

Object suffixes
	singular	plural
1st	-it	-iyuw
2nd	-ił	-iyuw
3rd	-∅	-wu

== Syntax ==
Basic word order in Ventureño is verb-initial.

=== Cleft sentences ===
Cleft sentences are fairly common in Ventureño. A typical cleft sentence involves nominalizing a verb with si=, preceded by a non-verbal constituent put into focus by this construction.

si= p- pu si= k- al- uštʼey
ART 2SG hand NMLZ 1SG REL touch
"I touch your hand"

== Numbers ==
The Chumash languages exhibit a quaternary numeral system. The numbers 1–16 exhibit certain characteristics which are different from the method of counting from 17 to 32. In all places, however, the multiple of 4 usually has a unique term. Ventureño Chumash has the most complete, native Chumash system of numbers on record.

- 1 pakeʼet
- 2 ʼiškom̓
- 3 masəx
- 4 tskumu
- 5 yətipakeʼes
- 6 yətiʼiškom̓
- 7 yətimasəx
- 8 malawa
- 9 tspa
- 10 kaʼaškom
- 11 təlu
- 12 masəx tskumu
- 13 masəx tskumu kampakeʼet
- 14 ʼiškom̓ laliet
- 15 pakeʼet siwe (tšikipš)
- 16 tšikipš
- 17 tšikipš kampakeʼet
- 18 ʼiškom̓ siwe tskumuʼuy
- 19 pakeʼet siwe tskumuʼuy
- 20 tskumuʼuy
- 21 tskumuʼuy kampakeʼet
- 22 ʼiškom̓ siwe itsmaxmasəx
- 23 pakeʼet siwe itsmaxmasəx
- 24 itsmaxmasəx
- 25 itsmaxmasəx kampakeʼet
- 26 ʼiškom̓ siwe yitimasəx
- 27 pakeʼet siwe yitimasəx
- 28 yitimasəx
- 29 yitimasəx kampakeʼet
- 30 ʼiškom̓ siwe ʼiškom̓ tšikipš
- 31 pakeʼet siwe ʼiškom̓ tšikipš
- 32 ʼiškom̓ tšikipš
