= Chumashan languages =

Extinct language family of California

Chumash
- Geographic distribution: southern coastal California
- Ethnicity: Chumash
- Extinct: 1965, with the death of Mary Yee (Barbareño)
- Linguistic classification: One of the world's primary language families
- Subdivisions: Obispeño; Island Chumash; Central Chumash

Language codes
- ISO 639-3: chs
- Glottolog: chum1262
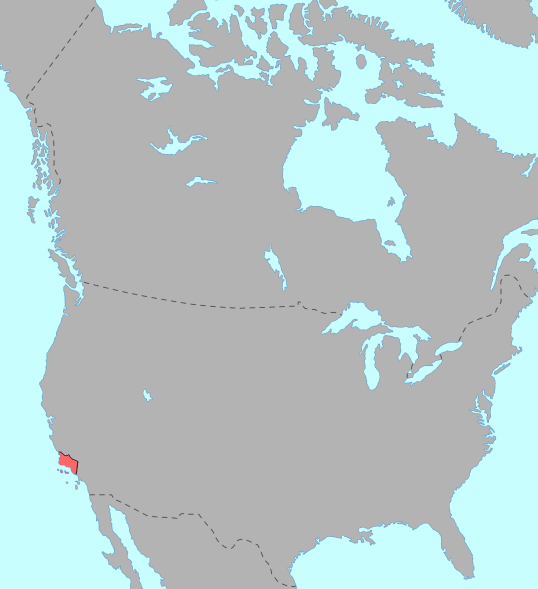
- Pre-contact distribution of Chumashan languages

Chumashan is an extinct and revitalizing family of languages that were spoken on the Central and southern California coast by Native American Chumash people, from the Coastal plains and valleys of San Luis Obispo to Malibu, neighboring inland and Transverse Ranges valleys and canyons east to bordering the San Joaquin Valley, to three adjacent Channel Islands: San Miguel, Santa Rosa, and Santa Cruz.

The Chumashan languages may be, along with Yukian and perhaps languages of southern Baja California such as Waikuri, one of the oldest language families established in California, before the arrival of speakers of Penutian, Uto-Aztecan, and perhaps even Hokan languages. Chumashan, Yukian, and southern Baja languages are spoken in areas with long-established populations of a distinct physical type. The population in the core Chumashan area has been stable for the past 10,000 years. However, the attested range of Chumashan is recent (within a couple thousand years). There is internal evidence that Obispeño replaced a Hokan language and that Island Chumash mixed with a language very different from Chumashan; the islands were not in contact with the mainland until the introduction of plank canoes in the first millennium AD.

Although the Chumashan languages are now extinct or dormant, language revitalization programs are underway with four of these Chumashan languages. These languages are well-documented in the unpublished fieldnotes of linguist John Peabody Harrington. Especially well documented are Barbareño, Ineseño, and Ventureño. The last native speaker of a Chumashan language was Barbareño speaker Mary Yee, who died in 1965.

== Family division ==
=== Languages ===
Six Chumashan languages are attested, all now extinct. However, most of them are in the process of revitalization, with language programs and classes. Contemporary Chumash people now prefer to refer to their languages by native names rather than the older names based on the local missions.

- Chumashan
  - Northern Chumash
    - Obispeño (also known as Northern Chumash)
      Also known as Tiłhini by students of the language, after the name of the major village near which the mission was founded.
  - Southern Chumash
    - Island Chumash (mixed with non-Chumash)
      - Island Chumash (also known as Ysleño, Isleño, Cruzeño)
        Was spoken on the three inhabited islands in the Santa Barbara Channel Islands: Santa Rosa, San Miguel, and Santa Cruz.
    - Central Chumash
      - Purisimeño
      - Sʰamala (Ineseño)
        Also spelled Samala, spoken by the Santa Ynez Band. Currently being revived.
      - Barbareño
        The name Shmuwich or Šmuwič (meaning "coastal") is used by some organizations, but is not universally accepted. Currently being revived.
      - Mitsqanaqa'n (Ventureño)
        Students of the language and community members renamed the language after the name of a major village near which the mission was founded.

Obispeño was the most divergent Chumashan language. The Central Chumash languages include Purisimeño, Ineseño, Barbareño and Ventureño. There was a dialect continuum across this area, but the form of the language spoken in the vicinity of each mission was distinct enough to qualify as a different language.

There is very little documentation of Purisimeño. Ineseño, Barbareño and Ventureño each had several dialects, although documentation usually focused on just one. Island Chumash had different dialects on Santa Cruz Island, San Miguel Island and Santa Rosa Island, but all speakers were relocated to the mainland in the early 19th century. John Peabody Harrington conducted fieldwork on all the above Chumashan languages, but obtained the least data on Island Chumash, Purisimeño, and Obispeño. There is no linguistic data on Cuyama, though ethnographic data suggests that it was likely Chumash (Interior Chumash).

There are six or seven Chumashan languages, depending in part on how one interprets the status of the poorly attested Interior Chumash (Cuyama) as a distinct language.

==== Post-contact ====
The languages are named after the local Franciscan Spanish missions in California where Chumashan speakers were relocated and aggregated between the 1770s and 1830s:

- Obispeño—Mission San Luis Obispo de Tolosa
- Purisimeño—Mission La Purísima Concepción
- Ineseño—Mission Santa Inés
- Barbareño—Mission Santa Barbara
- Ventureño—Mission San Buenaventura

==== Genetic relations ====
Roland Dixon and Alfred L. Kroeber suggested that the Chumashan languages might be related to the neighboring Salinan in a Iskoman grouping. Edward Sapir accepted this speculation and included Iskoman in his classification of Hokan. More recently it has been noted that Salinan and Chumashan shared only one word, which the Chumashan languages probably borrowed from Salinan (the word for 'white clam shell', which was used as currency). As a result, the inclusion of Chumashan into Hokan is now disfavored by most specialists, and the consensus is that Chumashan has no identified linguistic relatives.

== Characteristics ==
The Chumashan languages are well known for their consonant harmony (regressive sibilant harmony). Mithun presents a scholarly synopsis of Chumashan linguistic structures.

=== Vowels ===
The Central Chumash languages all have a symmetrical six-vowel system. The distinctive high central vowel is written various ways, including ⟨ɨ⟩ "barred i," ⟨ə⟩ "schwa" and ⟨ï⟩ "i umlaut." Contemporary users of the languages favor /ɨ/ or /ə/.

Vowels of Central Chumash
	Front	Central	Back
High	i	ɨ/ə	u
Low	e	a	o

Features of this system include:

- Low-vowel harmony within morphemes: Within a single morpheme, adjacent low vowels match: they are both or all front /e/, central /a/ or back /o/. Pan-Central examples:

expeč "to sing" — I/B/V
ʼosos "heel" — I/B/V
ʼasas "chin" — I/B/V

- Low-vowel harmony as a process: Many prefixes include a low vowel which shows up as /a/ when the vowel of the following syllable is high. When the vowel of the following syllable is low, the vowel of the prefix assimilates to (or "harmonizes" with) the front-central-back quality of the following vowel. The verb prefix kal- "of cutting" illustrates this process in the following Barbareño examples, where the /l/ may drop out:
  - kamasix 'to cut into three pieces' < kal- + masix 'three'
  - keseqen 'to cut out' < kal- + seqen 'to remove'
  - qoloq 'to make or bore a hole, cut a hole in' < kal- + loq 'to be perforated'
  - katun 'to cut into two pieces' < kal- + =tun 'of two, being two'

=== Consonants ===
The Central Chumash languages have a complex inventory of consonants. All of the consonants except /h/ can be glottalized; all of the consonants except /h/, /x/ and the liquids can be aspirated.

== Proto-language ==
Proto-Chumash
- Reconstruction of: Chumashan languages

Proto-Chumash reconstructions from Klar (1977):

no.	gloss	Proto-Chumash	Proto-Southern Chumash	notes
1	advise, to	*si/umun		
2	all		*yimlaʔ	
3	alone	*l-ho		
4	already	*kVla-		
5	ant	*tkaya’		plus sound symbolism
6	armpit	*ti/uq’olo(lo)		stem: *q'olo(lo)
7	arrive	*ki/um		
8	arrow		*ya'	
9	arroyo	*l’VmV		
10	ascend	*-nVpa		
11	ashamed, to be	*-nos-		
12	ashes	*qSa		
13	ask, to	*-VsqVnV		
14	back (body part)	*mVtV’		
15	ball	*-apapa		reduplicated stem
16	bat (animal)	*mVkala		
17	bathe, to	*k-ep’		
18	bear (animal)	*qus		
19	bee	*olo		plus sound symbolism
20	begin, to	*-nVna’		reduplicated stem?
21	blow, to	*aq-(tV)-p-; *-kVt	*-wu-	
22	boil, to	*-wi-		
23	bone	*Se		
24	bow (noun)	*aqa		
25	break, to	*k’oto; *eqe		
26	breast	*kVtet		
27	breathe; breath	*kal-haS; *-haS		
28	bring, to	*kVlhi		
29	burn, to	*qi/ut		
30	cost, to	*piw’		
31	carry, to	*kum		
32	carry on back, to	*sVpV		
33	cheek		*po'	
34	chest (body part)	*kVwV		
35	chia	*’epV-		
36	canoe		*tomolo	
37	clitoris	*Cele ~ *C’ele		
38	cold, to feel	*toqom ~ *qotom		
39	comb, to	*ti/ukikS		
40	come, to	*yit-i; *VlhVw		
41	concerned with, to be	*tak		
42	cooked	*pSel		
43	cough, to	*oqoqo-		reduplicated stem; onomatopoetic
44	cover, to	*Vqmay		
45	crack, split, to	*-eqe		
46	cut, to	*’iwa		plus reduplication
47	dark-colored, to be	*Soy		
48	day	*qSi; *-iSa-		
49	deaf	*tu’		
50	deep	*l-hiy		
51	die, to	*qSa		
52	dirt	*uyu		
53	drink; thirsty, to be	*aq-mihi-l-ha; *o-		
54	ear	*tu’		
55	earth		*šup	
56	eat, to	*uw		
57	eye, face	*tVq		
58	eyes, face, having to do with	*weqe		
59	far, to be	*mVkV		
60	fat	*qilhi		
61	fight, to	*aqi/u		
62	fire	*ne		
63	flower	*pey’		
64	flea	*-tep (Proto-Central Chumash)		
65	fly (insect)	*axulpes		
66	follow, to	*pey		
67	food (cf. eat)	*uw-		*uw- 'eat' plus *-mu (nominalizing suffix)
68	foot	*teme’		
69	forget, to	*may		
70	full from eating, to be	*qti’		
71	get up, to	*kVta’		
72	gopher snake	*pSoSo		reduplicated stem
73	grasshopper	*ti/uqu		root: *-qu
74	gull sp.	*miyV		
75	hair, fur	*SuSV		reduplicated stem?
76	hand	*pu		
77	hang, to	*wayan ~ *waya		
78	hear, to	*taq		
79	heel	*’ososo		reduplicated stem
80	hello (greeting)	*haku		
81	hole	*loq		
82	hole, cave, den	*Si ~ *SiSV		
83	homosexual, to be	*’aqi’		
84	jimson weed	*mom’oy		from *moy
85	knee	*pVm’V		
86	knife	*’iw		
87	lie down, to	*toy’ ~ *ton’		
88	liver	*c-al’a		
89	look, to	*kuti ~ *kuti’		
90	louse	*Seke		
91	low tide	*qVw		
92	many, much	*equ		
93	meat, body	*’Vmin’		
94	moist, to be	*so’		
95	money; clam sp.	*’ala-qu-Cum ~ *’ana-qu-Cum		*Cum is the root
96	mosquito	*pewe(we)’		
97	mother-in-law	*mVSV		
98	mountain lion	*tVkem’		
99	mouse	*qlo		plus reduplication
100	mouth	*’Vk		
101	name	*ti		
102	neck	*ni’		
103	necklace	*el’		
104	nerve	*pilhil		
105	nest	*patV ~ *patV’		
106	new, to be	*VmVn		
107	now	*kipV(’)		
108	oak spp.	*kuwu(’)		
109	one-eyed, to be	*ta’		
110	open, to	*kal		
111	overcast, to be	*iqVmay		
112	pelican	*sew		
113	person	*ku		
114	pet	*qo’		
115	pick up, lift, raise	*lay		
116	prickly pear	*qV’		
117	quail	*takaka		onomatopoetic
118	rabbit/jackrabbit	*ma’; *kuni’		
119	rain, to	*tuhuy ~ *tuy		
120	red	*qupe		
121	roadrunner	*pu’		
122	rub, to	*muy		
123	salt	*tepu(’) ~ *tipu(’)		
124	save (rescue), to	*apay		
125	seed	*’VmVn’		
126	skunk	*tVqema		
127	smoke	*tuwo’		
128	snail, sea	*q’VmV’		
129	speak, say, to	*’ipi(’)		
130	split-stick rattle	*wanS-aq’a ~ *wacs-aq’a		
131	spread open	*kek-an		
132	squirrel, ground	*emet’ ~ *em’et’		
133	steps	*tVyV-		
134	stick to, to	*pey ~ *pey’		
135	sticky, to be	*pilhiy		
136	stone, rock	*qVpV		
137	straight	*tyiyeme ?		
138	swordfish	*’eleyewun’		
139	tadpole	*qlo ~ *qyo		root: 'small creature' (cf. mouse)
140	tail	*telheq’		
141	take off, to	*qe		
142	tears	*tinik’		
143	tongue	*’elhew’		
144	tooth	*Sa		
145	urinate, to	*Sol’		
146	vomit	*paS(V)		
147	walk, to	-		
148	warm self, to	*mol		
149	water	*’o’		
150	whale	*paqat(V)		
151	wood, tree, stick	*pono’		
152	woodpecker	*pVlak’a(k’)		
153	wrinkled	*Sok’		plus reduplication
154	yawn	*San		plus reduplication
155	yellow jacket	*ɨyɨ ~ *ɨyɨ’		

== See also ==
- Rock art of the Chumash people
- Burro Flats Painted Cave
- Population of Native California
- Native Americans in the United States

== Bibliography ==
- Campbell, Lyle (1997). American Indian languages: The historical linguistics of Native America. New York: Oxford University Press. ISBN 0-19-509427-1.
- Dixon, Roland R.; Kroeber, Alfred L. (1913). "New Linguistic Families in California". American Anthropologist. 15: 647–655.
- Goddard, Ives, ed. (1996). Languages. Handbook of North American Indians. Vol. 17. W. C. Sturtevant (general ed.). Washington, D.C.: Smithsonian Institution. ISBN 0-16-048774-9.
- Golla, Victor (2011). California Indian Languages. Berkeley: University of California Press. ISBN 978-0-5202-6667-4.
- Grant, Campbell (1978). "Chumash: Introduction". In Heizer, Robert F.; Sturtevant, William C. (eds.). California. Handbook of North American Indians. Vol. 8. Washington, D.C.: Smithsonian Institution.
- Klar, Kathryn (1977). Topics in historical Chumash grammar (Doctoral dissertation). University of California, Berkeley.
- Kroeber, Alfred Louis (1910). The Chumash and Costanoan languages. Berkeley: The University Press.
- Mithun, Marianne (1999). The languages of Native North America. Cambridge: Cambridge University Press. ISBN 0-521-29875-X. ISBN 0-521-23228-7 (hbk).
- Sapir, Edward (1917). "The Position of Yana in the Hokan Stock". University of California Publications in American Archaeology and Ethnology. 13. Berkeley: University of California: 1–34.
