= Barbareño language =

Extinct Native American language

Barbareño
- Šmuwič
- Native to: California, United States
- Region: Santa Barbara, Santa Ynez
- Extinct: 1965, with the death of Mary Yee
- Revival: 2010
- Language family: Chumashan: Southern; Central; Barbareño
- Dialects: Emigdiano

Language codes
- ISO 639-3: boi
- Glottolog: barb1263
- ELP: Barbareño

Barbareño is a Chumashan language indigenous to the area in and around Santa Barbara, California. A dialect of the Barbareño language was also "spoken at San Emigdio near Buena Vista Lake" in the southern Central Valley. This dialect, called Emigdiano, "was heavily influenced by Buena Vista Yokuts". Barbareño lost its last known native speaker in 1965 with the death of Mary Yee. Both Barbareño and its sister language Ineseño are currently undergoing processes of language revitalization.

== Language revitalization ==
As of 2013, the Barbareño Chumash Council is engaged in ongoing efforts to revive the language. Two of its members are language apprentices and teachers. Wishtoyo Chumash Village, in Malibu, California, announced the opening of its Šmuwič Language School in 2010.

== Phonology ==
=== Consonants ===
Barbareño consonant phonemes
		Bilabial	Alveolar		Postalveolar/ Palatal	Velar	Uvular	Glottal
		Bilabial	plain	sibilant	Postalveolar/ Palatal	Velar	Uvular	Glottal
Plosive/ Affricate	plain	p	t	t͡s	t͡ʃ	k	q	ʔ
Plosive/ Affricate	ejective	pʼ	tʼ	t͡sʼ	t͡ʃʼ	kʼ	qʼ	ʔ
Plosive/ Affricate	aspirated	pʰ	tʰ	t͡sʰ	t͡ʃʰ	kʰ	qʰ	ʔ
Fricative	plain			s	ʃ	x		h
Fricative	ejective			sʼ	ʃʼ	xʼ		
Fricative	aspirated			sʰ	ʃʰ			
Nasal	plain	m	n					
Nasal	glottalized	ˀm	ˀn					
Approximant	plain		l		j	w		
Approximant	glottalized		ˀl		ˀj	ˀw		

=== Vowels ===
Barbareño vowel phonemes
	Front	Central	Back
Close	i	ɨ	u
Open	e	a	o
