= Santa Cruz Island =

Island in California, United States

Native name: Isla de Santa Cruz (Spanish) Limuw or Michumash (Cruzeño)
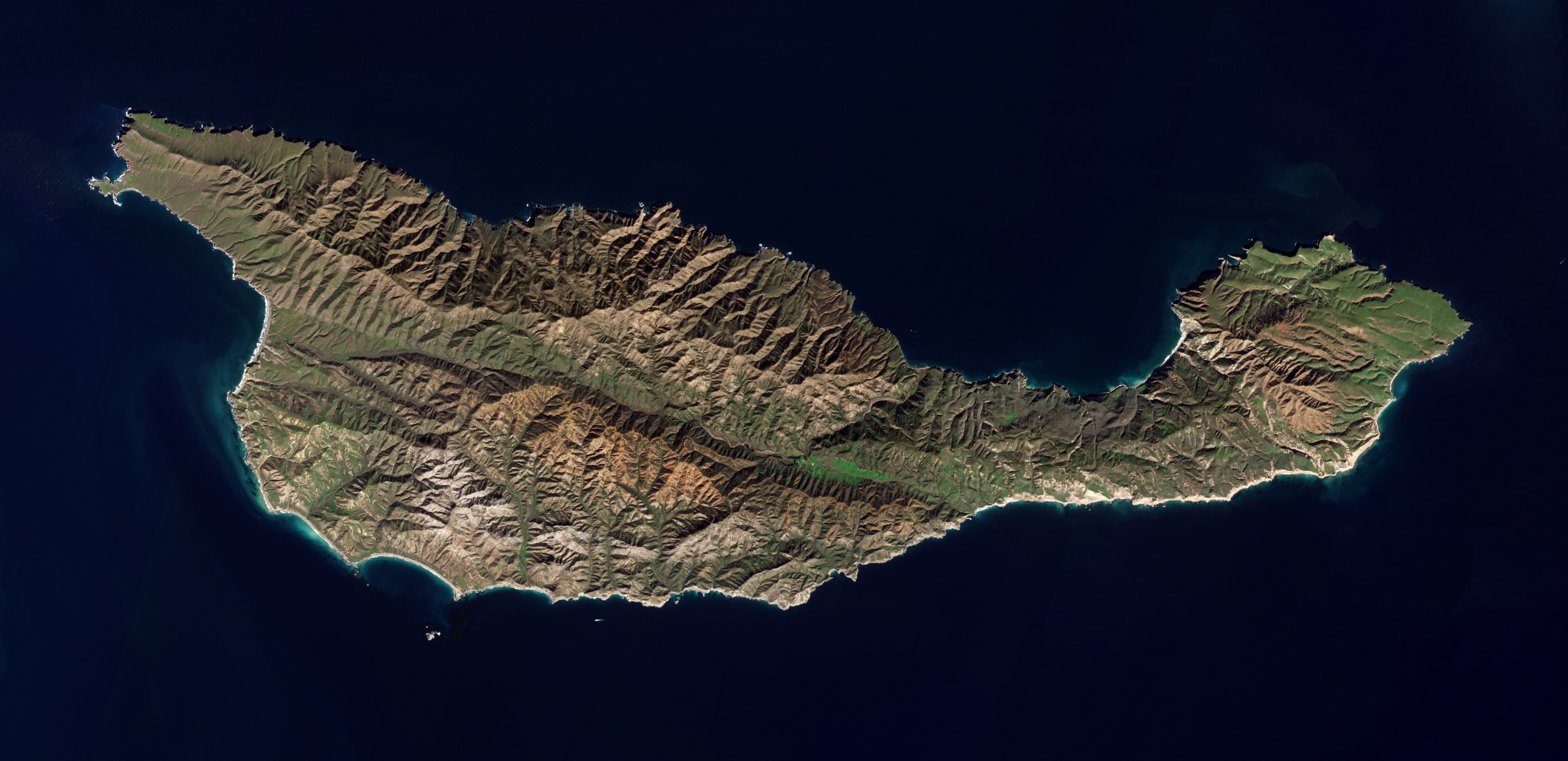
- ESA satellite image of Santa Cruz Island

Geography
- Coordinates: 34°00′N 119°43′W
- Area: 97 sq mi (250 km^{2})
- Length: 22 mi (35 km)
- Width: 6 mi (10 km)
- Highest elevation: 2,429 ft (740.4 m)
- Highest point: Devils Peak

Administration
- United States
- State: California
- County: Santa Barbara

Demographics
- Population: Rangers and tourists are the only residents

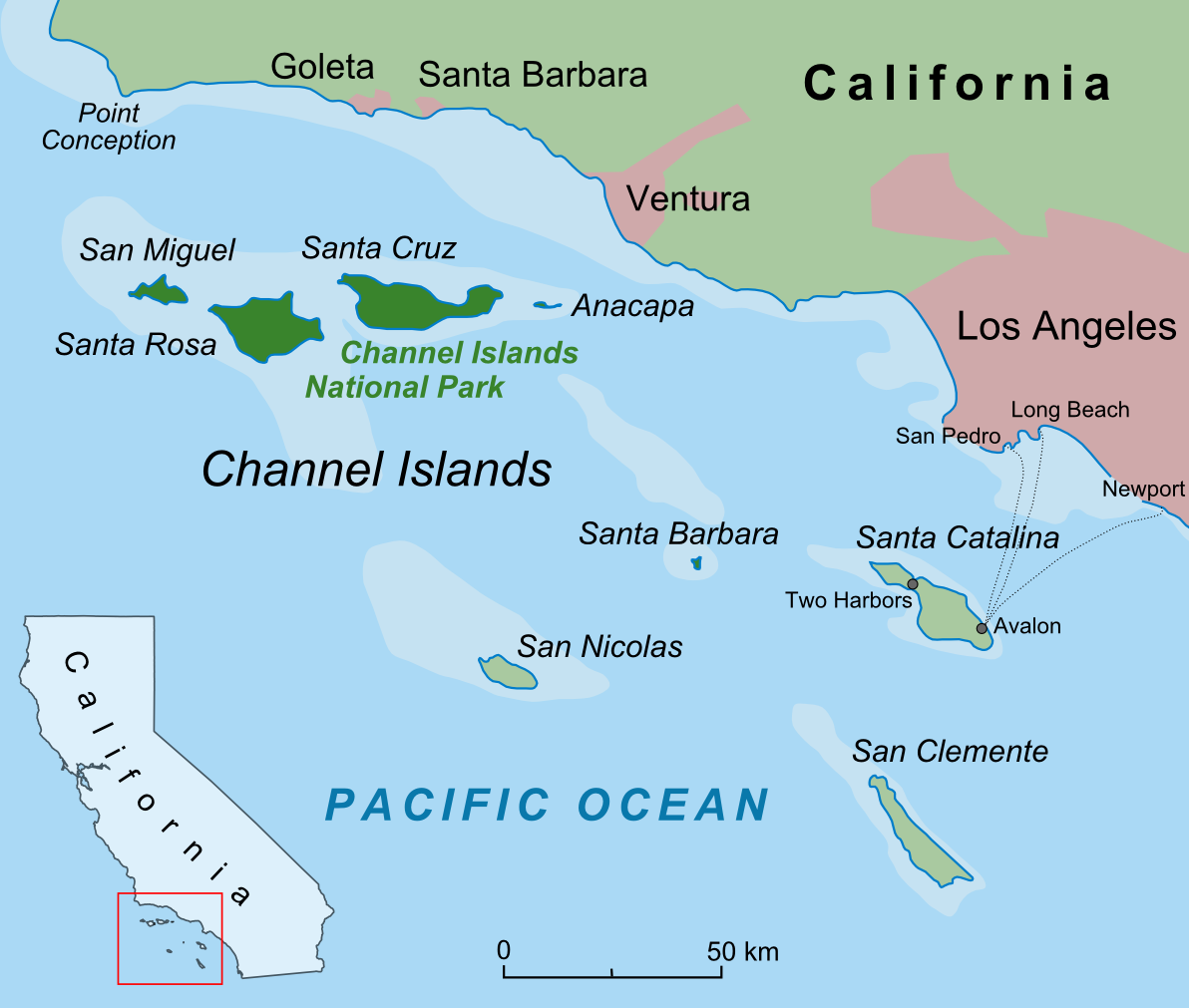
Map of the Channel Islands

Santa Cruz Island (Spanish: Isla Santa Cruz, Chumash: Limuw) is located off the southwestern coast of Ventura, California, United States. It is the largest island in California and largest of the eight islands in the Channel Islands archipelago and Channel Islands National Park. Forming part of the northern group of the Channel Islands, Santa Cruz is 22 miles (35 km) long and 2 to 6 miles (3 to 10 km) wide with an area of 61,764.6 acres (249.952 km^{2}).

The island's coastline has steep cliffs, large sea caves, coves, and sandy beaches. The highest point is Devils Peak, at 2,429 feet (740 m). A central valley splits the island along the Santa Cruz Island Fault, with volcanic rock on the north and older sedimentary rock on the south. This volcanic rock was heavily fractured during an uplift phase that formed the island, and over a hundred large sea caves have been carved into the resulting faults. The largest is Painted Cave, among the world's largest.

The island is part of Santa Barbara County, California. The 2000 census showed a population of two people. Santa Cruz is the largest privately owned island off the contiguous United States. Ownership is split between the National Park Service (24%) and the Nature Conservancy (76%).

Public passenger access to the eastern portion of Santa Cruz Island is provided by the Island Packers ferry service out of the Ventura Harbor.

== History ==
=== Early history ===
Archaeological investigations indicate that Santa Cruz Island has been occupied for at least 10,000 years. It was known as Limuw (place of the sea) or Michumash in the Chumash language. The Chumash people who lived on the island developed a highly complex society dependent on marine harvest, craft specialization, and trade with the mainland population. The Chumash constructed shell mounds across the island, including a 4 m (13 feet) deep mound at Prisoners Harbor, and El Montón, a 44,000 m^{2} (11 acres) mound on the western shore. Constructed between 6,000 and 2,500 BCE, El Montón probably began as a simple shell midden made mostly of California Mussel and red abalone shells, but grew over time as feasting and other ceremonial events continued adding to the mound's size - eventually reaching 8 m (26 ft) in height. Over 50 houses, a sweat lodge, other structures were constructed on El Montón, which probably served as a major ceremonial site given its prominence over the surrounding area and hundreds of high-status burials. Juan Rodríguez Cabrillo first observed the island in 1542, later estimated to be inhabited by 2,000 to 3,000 Chumash on the three northern Channel Islands, with 11 villages on Santa Cruz.

In 1602, Sebastián Vizcaíno led the last Spanish expedition to California. His map named Santa Cruz Island the Isla de Gente Barbuda (island of the bearded people). Between 1602 and 1769, no recorded European contact with the island existed. Finally, in 1769, the land-and-sea expedition of Don Gaspar de Portolà reached Santa Cruz Island. Traveling with him were Father Juan González Vizcaíno and Father Francisco Palóu. Father Palóu wrote of Father Vizcaíno's visit to the Santa Cruz village of Xaxas, that the missionaries on the ship went ashore and "they were well received by the heathen and presented with fish, in return for which the Indians were given some strings of beads."

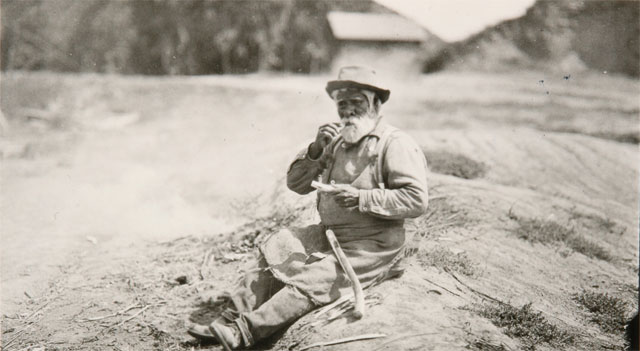
Fernando Librado was born at Mission San Buenaventura in 1839 as the son of two parents from Chumash villages located on the island.

The island was considered for the establishment of a Catholic mission to serve the large Chumash population. When Mission San Buenaventura was founded across the channel in 1782, the slow religious conversion of the Santa Cruz Chumash commenced. Beset by diseases such as measles, the Chumash declined in numbers until 1822, when the last Chumash left the island for mainland California missions.

The name of Santa Cruz for the island came about when Gaspar de Portola expedition visited the Chumash village Xaxas on the island. On the next day, the Chumash returned a staff topped by an iron cross, which the Spanish had inadvertently left behind. Hence, the name La Isla de la Santa Cruz (Island of the Holy Cross) appeared on their exploration map of 1770. George Vancouver used the same name on his 1793 map.

With Mexico's independence from Spain in 1821, the Mexican government asserted its control over Alta California. To increase the Mexican presence, the government began sending convicted criminals to California in 1830. Around 80 prisoners were sent to Santa Barbara, where, upon arrival, 31 incorrigibles were sent to Santa Cruz Island. They lived briefly in an area now known as Prisoners' Harbor before escaping to the mainland.

=== Mexican land grant ===
Governor Juan Alvarado made a Mexican land grant of the Island of Santa Cruz to his aide Captain Andrés Castillero in 1839. When California became a state in 1850, the United States government, through the Treaty of Guadalupe Hidalgo, required that land previously granted by Spanish and Mexican governments be proved before the Board of Land Commissioners. A claim was filed with the Land Commission in 1852, confirmed by the US Supreme Court in 1860. The grant was patented to Andrés Castillero in 1867. Castillero transferred title to his agent William Barron in 1857.

=== Ranching ===
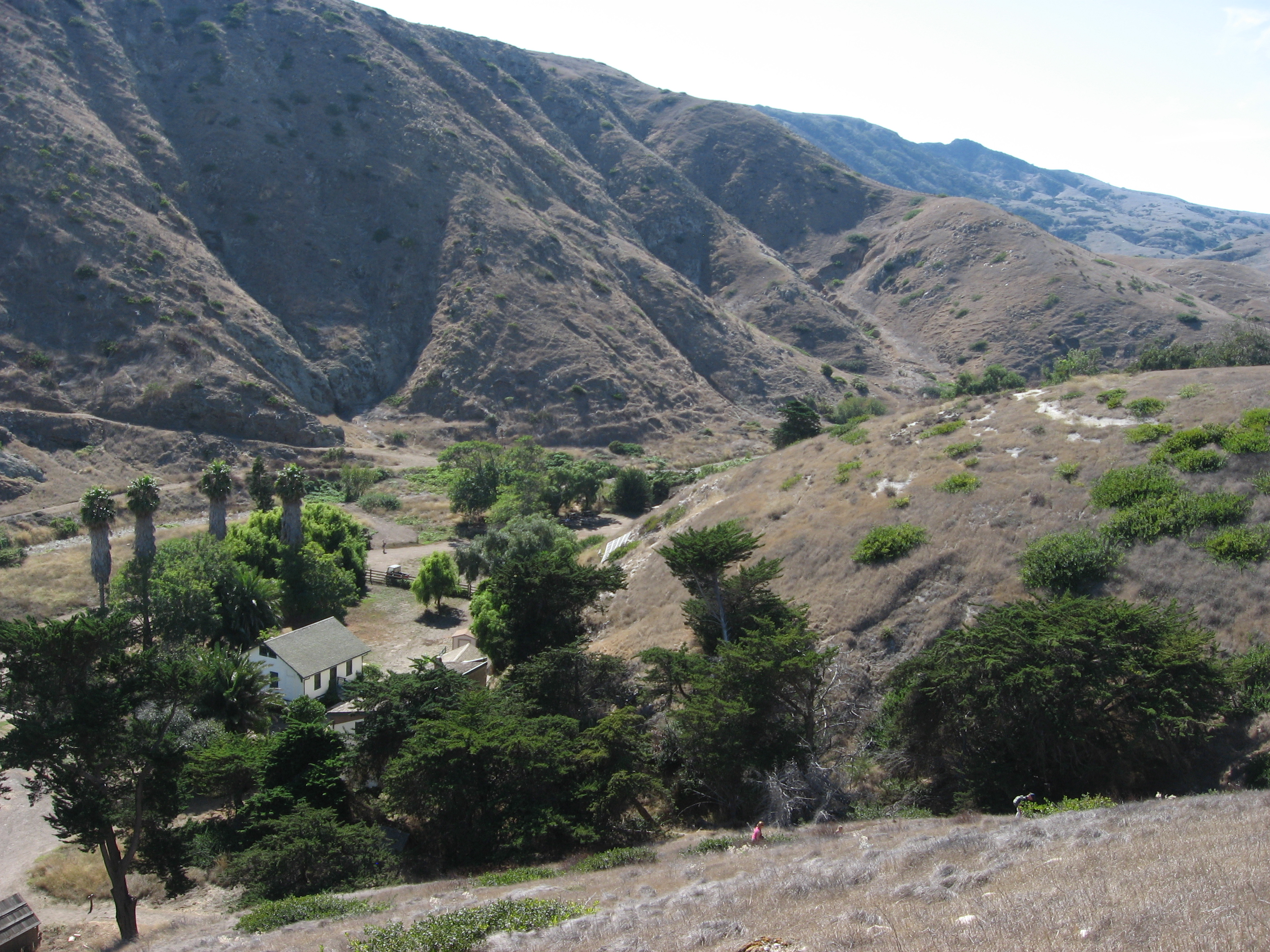
Scorpion Ranch, 2009

William Barron was a San Francisco businessman and co-owner of Barron, Forbes & Co. Dr. James Barron Shaw was hired to manage things and charged by Barron to start a sheep operation. He built corrals and houses for himself and his employees and expanded the road system. He imported cattle, horses, and sheep to the island and erected one of the earliest wharves along the California coast at Prisoners' Harbor. Shaw was the first rancher to ship sheep to San Francisco by steamer, some selling at $30 per animal. By 1869, the year he left Santa Cruz, Shaw's island sheep ranch was well known, and some 24,000 sheep grazed the hills and valleys of Santa Cruz Island. At that time, the gross proceeds from the ranch on Santa Cruz Island were supposedly $50,000. Barron sold the island for $150,000 in 1869, and Shaw left for San Francisco and Los Alamos, where he continued ranching.

Ten investors from San Francisco purchased the island, headed by Gustave Mahé. One of the investors, Justinian Caire, was a French immigrant and founder of a successful San Francisco hardware business (Justinian Caire Company) that sold equipment to miners and by 1886 Caire had acquired all of the shares of the Santa Cruz Island Company which he and his colleagues had founded in 1869. He then implemented his vision of building a self-sustaining sheep and cattle ranch, vineyard, and a nut and fruit grove operation on the island. Main Ranch was augmented with nine other ranches, Prisoners' Harbor, Christy, Scorpion, Smugglers, Forney's Cove/Rancho Nuevo, Poso, Buena Vista Portezuela, and Sur Ranch. In 1885, he operated the largest private telephone system in the US then. A post office operated from 1895 until 1903, while there were 110 workers on the island in 1889. The operation received water from four springs, El Pato, Gallina, The Dindos, and The Peacock, which fed into a 26,000-US-gallon (98,000 L) reservoir, tanks, and dams. The vineyard was planted in 1884, and by 1895, the winery was maturing 86,000-US-gallon (330,000 L) from the 200-acre (80 ha) vineyard.

A 1910 postcard depicting Santa Cruz Island

Justinian Caire's will stipulated that his two sons, Arthur and Frederic, were to be executors of his will and continue managing operations with little change. However, Justinian signed over to his wife Albina, who had all shares in the Justinian Caire Company and Santa Cruz Company the year before he died in 1897. His sons continued a successful livestock, winemaking and ranching industry on the island after his death, at least until Albina distributed Santa Cruz Island Company shares amongst her children between late 1910 and early 1911. Albina, Fred, Arthur, Delphine, and Helene received 86 percent of the stock, while the two married daughters Amelie and Aglaë received 14 percent.

In the 1920s and 1930s, after legal disputes fractured the Caire family's ownership, the eastern portion of Santa Cruz Island came under the control of Justinian Caire's daughter Amelie's daughter Maria and her husband Ambrose Gherini. The Gherini Family operated a commercial sheep ranching business that persisted for several decades. At its peak, the Gherini ranch managed several thousand sheep annually, supplying wool and meat to markets on the mainland. They maintained a base of operations at Scorpion Ranch, where a shearing shed, corrals, and other ranch buildings were established. The Gherinis continued ranching on the island until the late 20th century, ultimately selling their remaining land to the federal government in 1996 as part of the island's transition to public ownership.

In 1936, the Caire family reportedly offered 90% of the island for $750,000 to California for use as a state or federal park, but nothing came of it. Most of Caire's descendants were compelled to sell it in 1937 to pay their legal costs.

The buyer was Los Angeles oilman Edwin Stanton. Stanton's purchase of the major part of Santa Cruz Island brought a major shift in agricultural production on the island. After trying for a short time to continue the sheep operation, bringing in 10,000 head, he decided to switch to beef production. At the time, the beef industry in California was growing rapidly, with Santa Barbara County among the top ten beef producers in the state. Edwin Stanton's ranch on Santa Cruz Island saw changes that reflected the evolution of cattle ranching in a working landscape. While retaining most of the 19th-century structures dating from the Caire period, Stanton constructed a few buildings to meet the needs of his cattle ranch, the most notable of which is Rancho del Norte on the isthmus. Pasture fencing and corrals were altered to suit the cattle operation, and an extensive water system was added to provide water to the cattle.

=== National Park and Nature Conservancy preserve ===
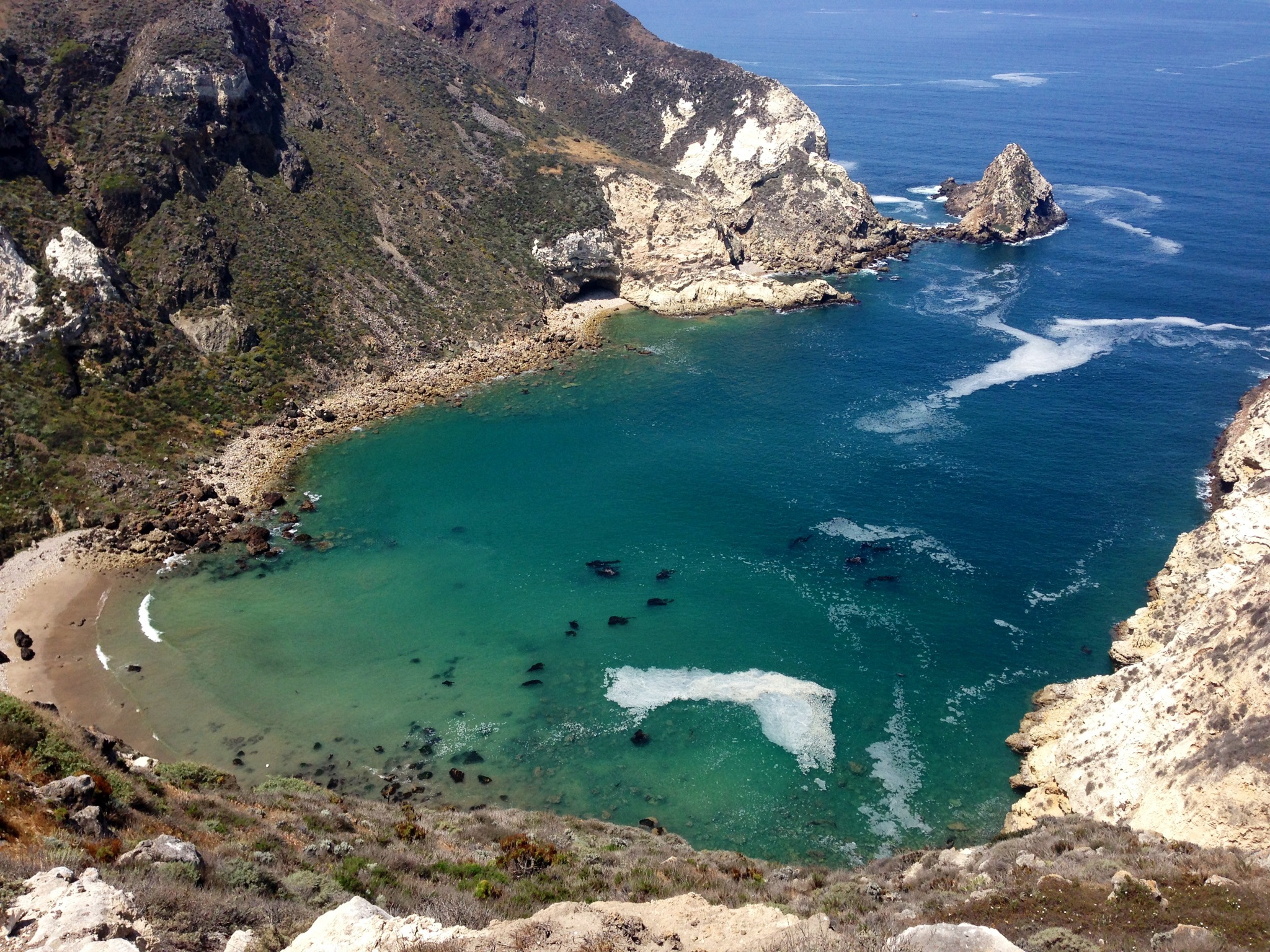
Potato Harbor

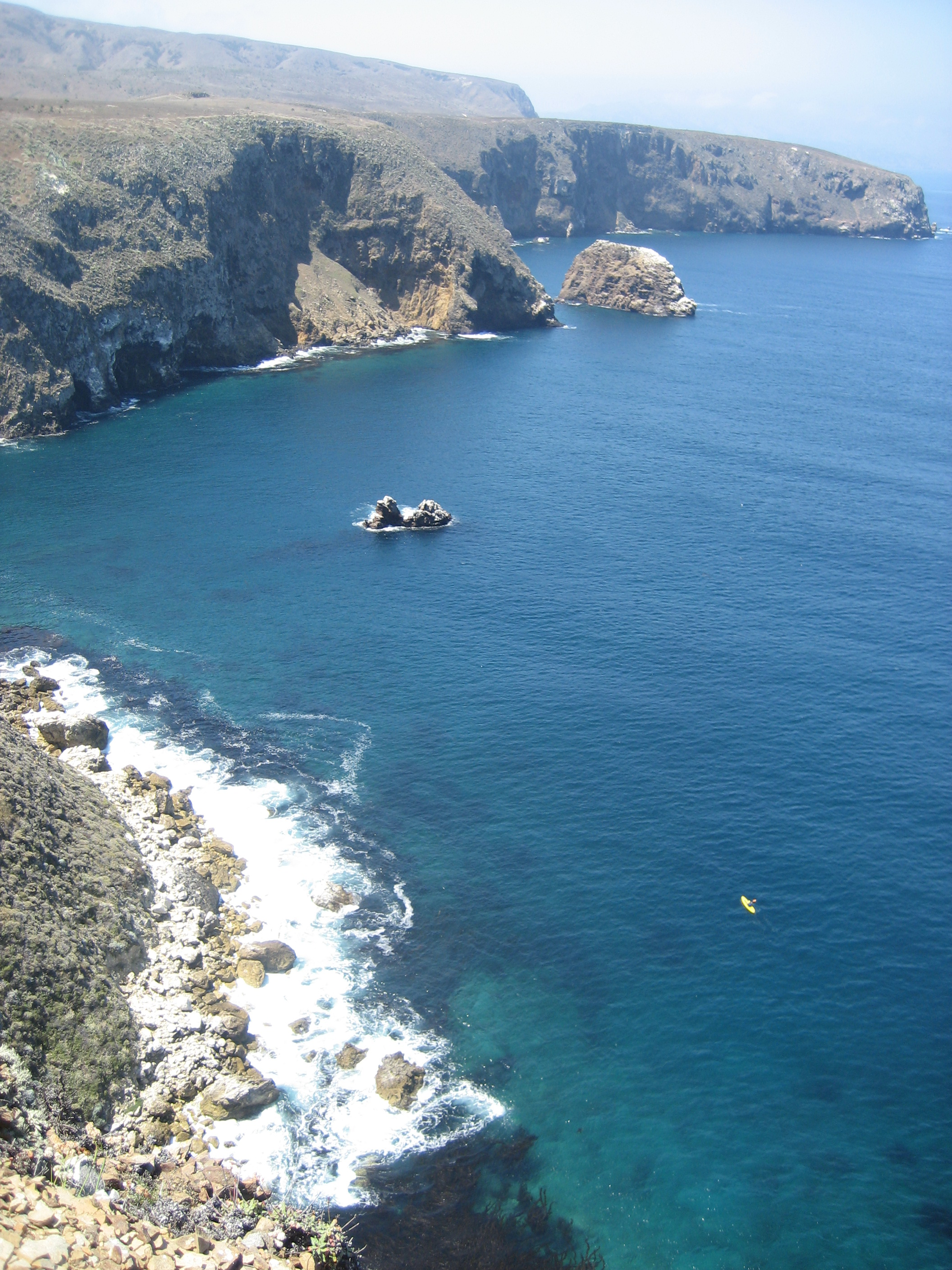
The north coast of Santa Cruz Island in August

After Channel Islands National Park was established in 1980, the federal government sought to acquire the remaining eastern portion of Santa Cruz Island, then owned by the four Gherini siblings. Two of the siblings and the heirs of a third sold their undivided interests to the National Park Service in the early 1990s for approximately $4 million per share. However, the other sibling—**Francis Gherini**—inherited a 25% interest and steadfastly refused to sell, arguing the offer undervalued the property. This refusal effectively blocked full federal acquisition. Following a 1996 Congressional declaration of taking, the government acquired Francis's share for about $14 million (including interest), enabling the Park Service to gain control of the entire eastern parcel.

The last of the 10,000 sheep on the island were removed by 1999.

With Edwin Stanton's death in 1964, his widow and son, Carey, re-incorporated the Santa Cruz Island Company and continued the cattle operations on the island. Carey Stanton died unexpectedly in 1987 at the ranch and was buried in the family plot in the island chapel yard at the Main Ranch. The real property passed to The Nature Conservancy through a prior agreement that Carey Stanton had established with the non-profit organization. The Nature Conservancy rapidly liquidated the cattle operation and ended the ranching era on the island. They also were able to eliminate the last of the feral pigs by 2006. The removal of the pigs took a total of 14 months. It was accomplished through trapping, aerial shooting from helicopters, ground-based hunting with dogs, and the use of sterilized adult pigs with radio collars to locate surviving pigs. The time taken to eradicate pigs on Santa Cruz Island was about half that taken on a neighboring island of similar size (Santa Rosa Island) A gift of 8,500 acres (3,400 hectares) from the Nature Conservancy to the park was completed in 2000.

The National Park Service owns and operates approximately 24% of Santa Cruz Island. The remaining land, known as the Santa Cruz Island Reserve, is used for scientific research and education and is managed by a combination of organizations, including The Nature Conservancy, the University of California Natural Reserve System, and the Santa Cruz Island Foundation. The Reserve and its staff provide accommodations for visiting students and researchers.

=== Other uses ===
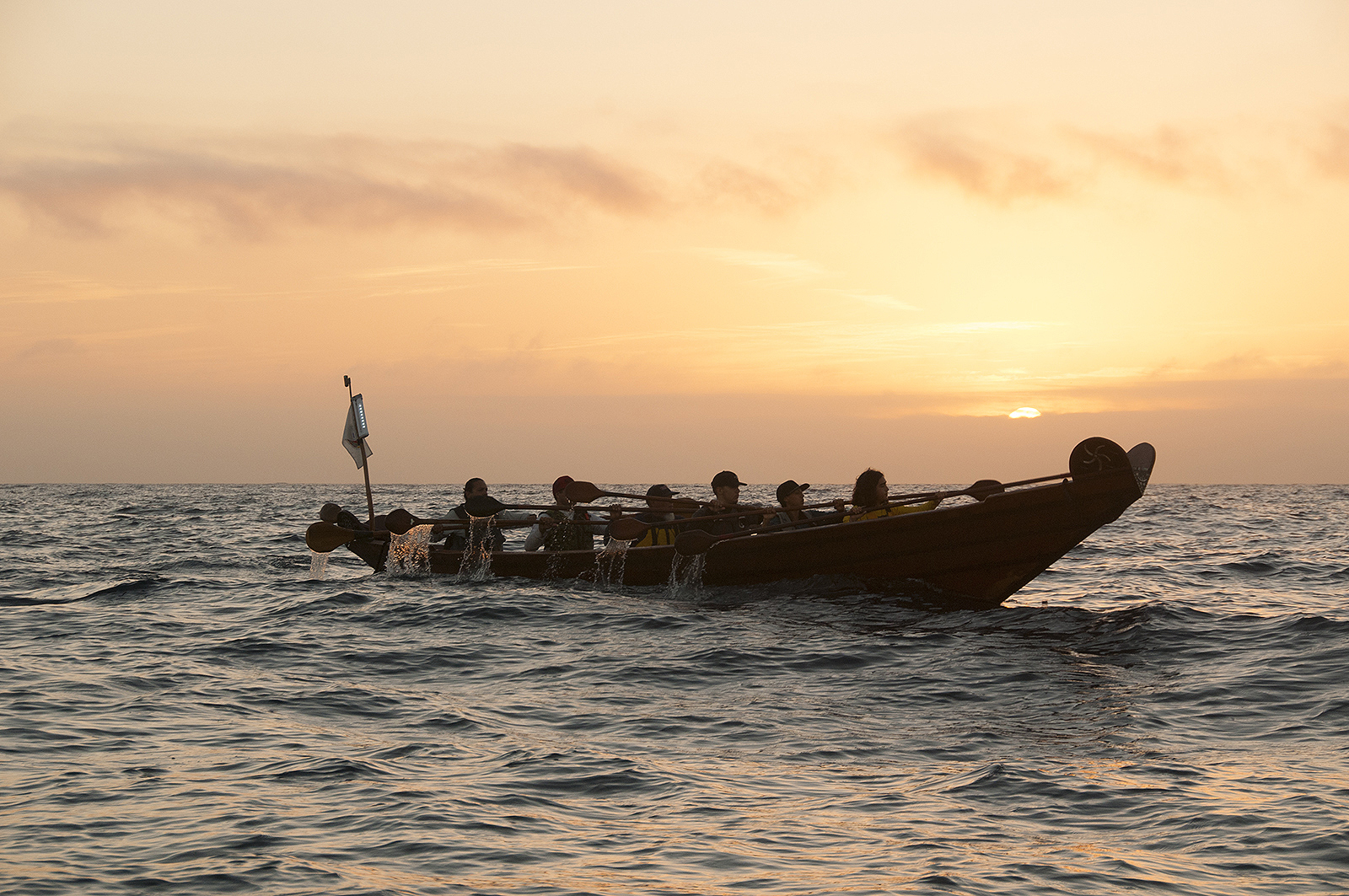
The Chumash have revived their cultural practice of crossing from Channel Islands Harbor to the island in a 17.2-mile (28 km) journey via tomol, a wooden plank boat.

Santa Cruz was a base for otter hunters, fishermen, and smugglers. The Channel Islands often provided smugglers and bootleggers with convenient yet isolated hideaways to store their goods. One such area is known today as Smugglers Cove.

George Nidever recalled hunting otter at Santa Cruz in the winter of 1835–36. Working from a base camp at Santa Rosa Island, he and two others obtained 60 skins that season. Fishermen encamped on the island, trading fish for other goods from passing boats.

Several movies were shot on the island, including Peter Pan and The Rescue.

The Richfield Oil Corporation acquired an exploration lease in 1954 but did not find oil.

UC Santa Barbara established a summer geology class in 1963, and the Santa Cruz Island Field Station in 1966.

The Santa Cruz Island Hunt Club operated from 1966 until 1985, beginning as a sheep and pig hunting during a rifle season and an archery season.

The United States military began to use Santa Cruz Island during World War II, and has constructed and maintained strategic installations on the island. Like all of the Channel Islands, Santa Cruz Island was used as an early warning outpost for observing enemy planes and ships during World War II. During the Cold War a communications station was installed as a part of the Pacific Missile Range Facility. This station remains in operation, although not at the levels of use seen in the 1950s and 1960s.

== Wildlife, plants, and climate ==
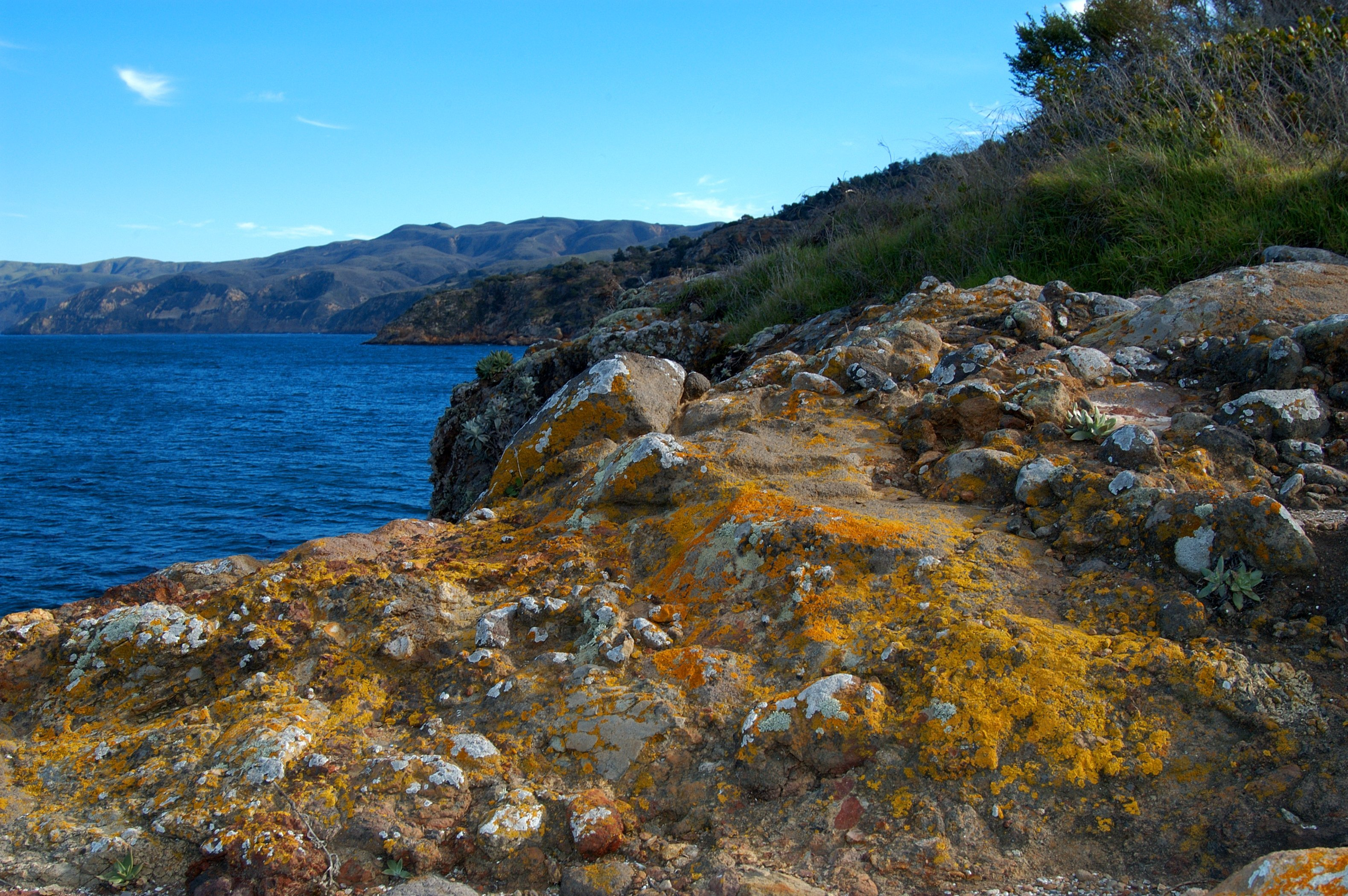
Lichen-encrusted rocks upon the cliffs of Santa Cruz Island

Santa Cruz Island is home to some endemic species of animals and plants, including the Santa Cruz Island fox (Urocyon littoralis santacruzae), a subspecies of the island fox.

Introduced and invasive species on Santa Cruz Island include:

- Golden eagle (invader), which replaced the native bald eagle, and hunted island foxes to threatened status. Attracted initially by the presence of pigs.
- Fennel (introduced), served as cover for Island foxes, but as forage for the feral pigs.
- Feral pigs (introduced), displaced native island foxes. No longer present as of 2006.
- Santa Cruz sheep, no longer present.
- Santa Cruz Island horse, no longer present as of 1999.

Native species include:

- Island Spotted Skunk
- Island scrub-jay, which is only found on Santa Cruz Island
- Hoffman's rockcress, which is found only from Santa Cruz Island and Santa Rosa Island.
- Island manzanita and whitehair manzanita, shrubs which are endemic to Santa Cruz Island.
- Island fence lizard, endemic to the Channel Islands of California
- Island foxes are indigenous to the island. Roughly the size of housecats, island foxes are unafraid of humans. They can be seen with regularity in most of the campgrounds on Santa Cruz Island. The Santa Cruz Island Fox (Urocyon littoralis santacruzae) is the subspecies of Island Fox native to Santa Cruz Island.

The native plant communities of Santa Cruz Island include chaparral, oak woodland, Bishop pine (Pinus muriacata) forest, grassland and coastal sage scrub. Where sheep grazing was prevalent, the native plant cover has been damaged, and erosion and gullying has been a problem in some areas. The native plant communities are slowly recovering since the removal of feral sheep and pigs.

=== Bald eagle reintroduction ===
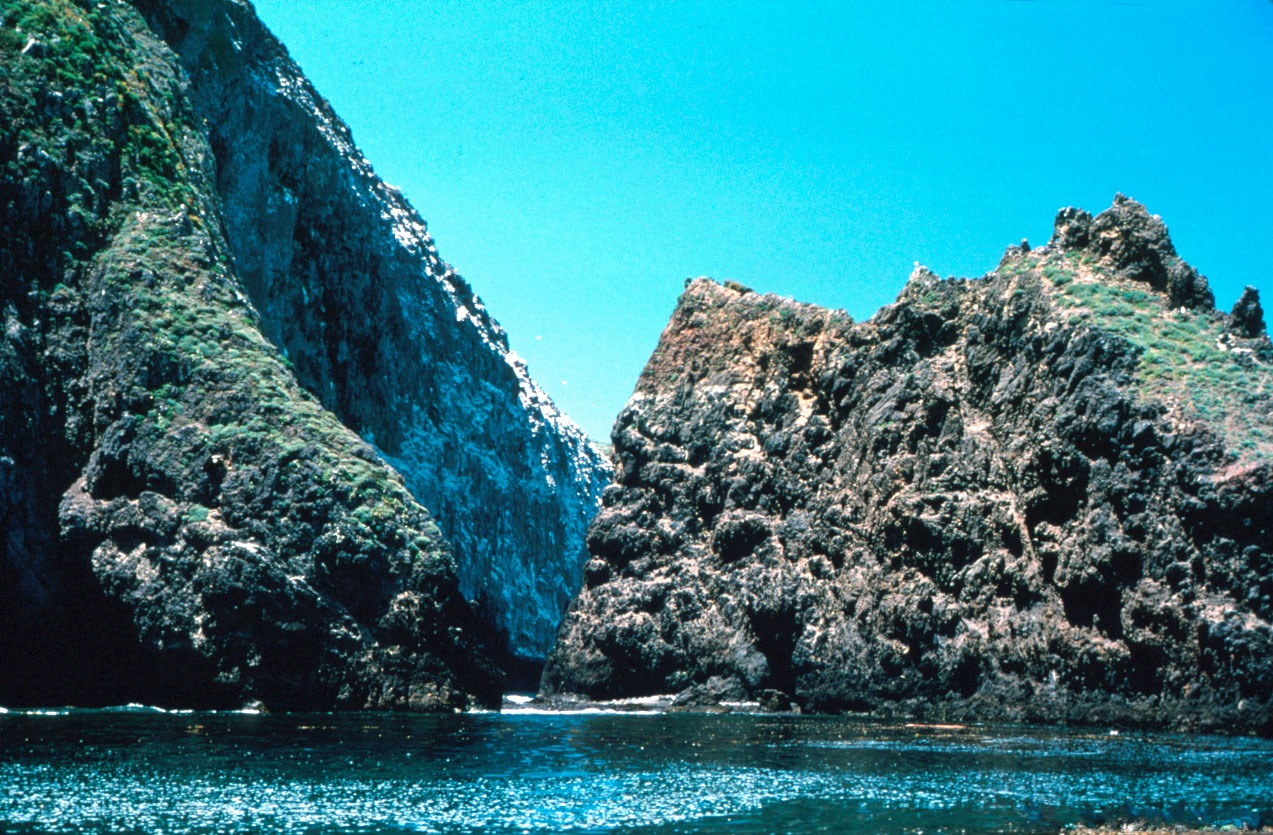
Santa Cruz Island

Bald eagles were once numerous on California's Channel Islands. Because of eggshell thinning caused by DDT and other factors, successful bald eagle nesting in the northern Channel Islands ended by 1949. By the 1960s, bald eagles could no longer be found on any of the Channel Islands.

As of 2013, there were five breeding pairs on Santa Cruz Island, two on Santa Rosa, and one on Anacapa, and a total of over 40 bald eagles on the northern Channel Islands. Between 2002 and 2006, the Channel Islands National Park (in conjunction with partner, Institute for Wildlife Studies) introduced sixty-one young bald eagles to the northern Channel Islands, using a "hacking" process of keeping 8 weeks old eagles in one of two hack towers on Santa Cruz Island, until at age three months, they were ready to fly. On the Channel Islands, where large trees are scarce, bald eagles have built nests on cliff faces, rock shelves and shallow cliffs, as well as in island pines and Torrey pines. One pair attempted nesting in a grassland on Santa Cruz Island. In 2006, for the first time in over 50 years, a bald eagle hatched on Santa Cruz Island.

Because nesting bald eagles can deter golden eagles (Aquila chrysaetos) from breeding, the recovery of bald eagles on the northern Channel Islands has also helped enable recovery of the endangered island fox. Golden eagle predation had been responsible for the steep decline of island foxes on the northern Channel Islands in the 1990s.

=== Climate ===
The climate of Santa Cruz Island is marine temperate, with frosts rare and snow almost unknown except very rarely on the highest mountain slopes. Annual rainfall varies from about 16 in (410 mm) on the shoreline, to 25 in (640 mm) on the highest mountain slopes. Precipitation is highly variable from year to year, with wet years alternating with drought years. Most of the rain falls from November to March. Summers are dry, but often overcast and cool with coastal fog.

Climate data for Santa Cruz Island
Month	Jan	Feb	Mar	Apr	May	Jun	Jul	Aug	Sep	Oct	Nov	Dec	Year
Record high °F (°C)	86 (30)	86 (30)	94 (34)	96 (36)	101 (38)	109 (43)	109 (43)	105 (41)	104 (40)	103 (39)	97 (36)	89 (32)	109 (43)
Mean daily maximum °F (°C)	64 (18)	64 (18)	65 (18)	67 (19)	69 (21)	71 (22)	73 (23)	74 (23)	74 (23)	72 (22)	68 (20)	64 (18)	69 (21)
Daily mean °F (°C)	53 (12)	54 (12)	56 (13)	58 (14)	60 (16)	63 (17)	66 (19)	66 (19)	65 (18)	62 (17)	56 (13)	52 (11)	59 (15)
Mean daily minimum °F (°C)	41 (5)	44 (7)	46 (8)	48 (9)	51 (11)	54 (12)	58 (14)	58 (14)	56 (13)	51 (11)	44 (7)	40 (4)	49 (9)
Record low °F (°C)	24 (−4)	25 (−4)	30 (−1)	33 (1)	38 (3)	41 (5)	45 (7)	43 (6)	42 (6)	31 (−1)	30 (−1)	20 (−7)	20 (−7)
Average precipitation inches (mm)	3.5 (89)	4.1 (100)	3.2 (81)	1.0 (25)	0.3 (7.6)	0.1 (2.5)	0 (0)	0.1 (2.5)	0.3 (7.6)	0.8 (20)	1.6 (41)	2.9 (74)	18 (460)
Source: The Weather Channel

== Transportation ==
Santa Cruz Island has several airstrips, all operated by The Nature Conservancy:

- Santa Cruz Island Airport (IATA: SZN, ICAO: KSZN, FAA LID: 44CA) had one 2,100 ft (640 m) turf runway with orientation 9/27 and was located at 34°03′38″N 119°54′55″W. The airport is no longer registered or active.
- Christy Airstrip (FAA LID: CA97) has a 2,500 ft (760 m) turf runway with orientation 9/27 and is located at 34°01′07″N 119°51′07″W.
- Santa Cruz Ranch Airport (FAA LID: 44CA) has a 1,697 ft (517 m) turf runway with orientation 9/27 and is located at 33°59′21″N 119°40′50″W.
