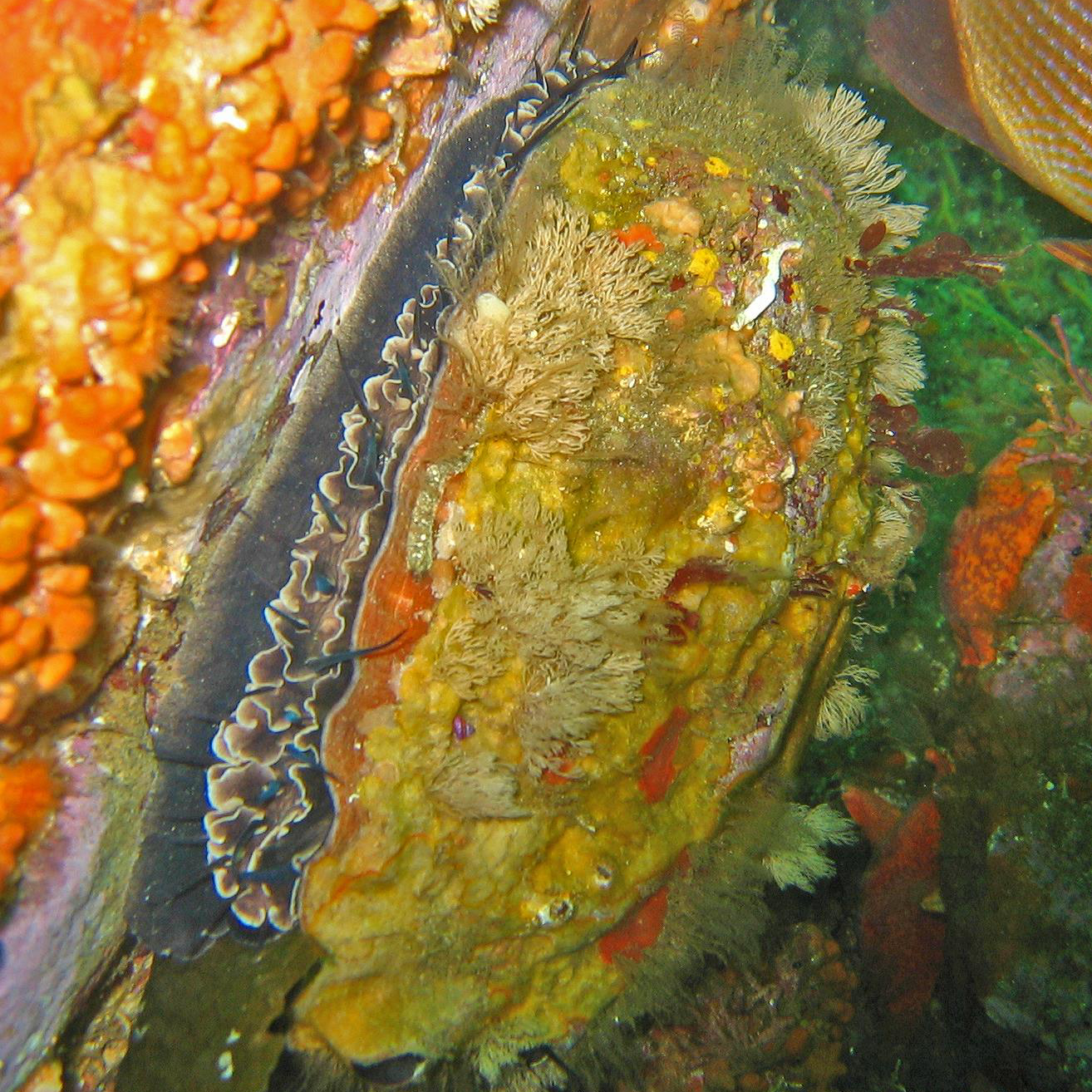

Conservation status
- Critically Endangered (IUCN 3.1)

- Apparently Secure (NatureServe)

Scientific classification
- Kingdom: Animalia
- Phylum: Mollusca
- Class: Gastropoda
- Subclass: Vetigastropoda
- Order: Lepetellida
- Superfamily: Haliotoidea
- Family: Haliotidae
- Genus: Haliotis
- Species: H. rufescens

Binomial name
- Haliotis rufescens Swainson, 1822

Synonyms
- Haliotis californiana Valenciennes, 1832; Haliotis hattorii Bartsch, 1940; Haliotis ponderosa C. B. Adams, 1848

= Haliotis rufescens =

Haliotis rufescens Temporal range: 70 –0 Ma

Species of gastropod

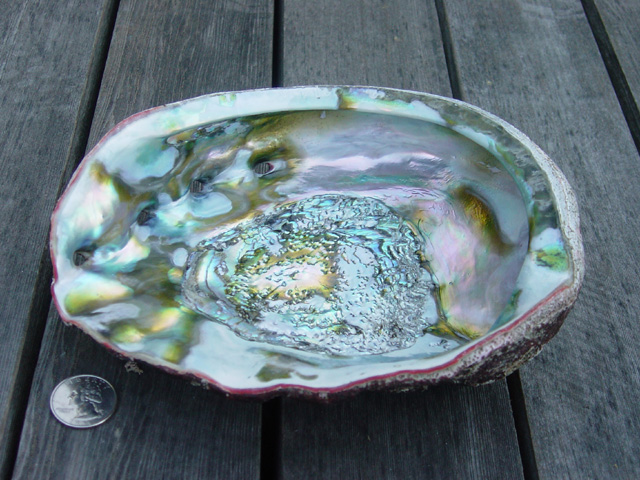
Interior of the shell of a red abalone. The US coin (quarter) is 24.257 mm or 0.955 inch in diameter

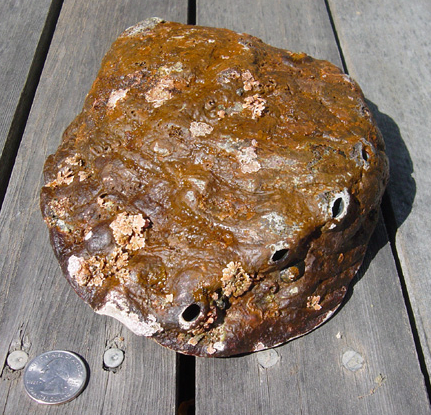
Outer surface of shell of red abalone, viewed from the anterior end. The US coin (quarter) is 24.257 mm or 0.955 inch in diameter

Haliotis rufescens (red abalone) is a species of very large edible sea snail in the family Haliotidae, the abalone, ormers (British) or pāua. It is distributed from British Columbia, Canada, to Baja California, Mexico. It is most common in the southern half of its range.

Red abalone is the largest and most common abalone found in the northern part of the state of California, United States.

== Habitat ==
Red abalone live in rocky areas with kelp. They feed on the kelp species that grow in their home range, including giant kelp (Macrocystis pyrifera), feather boa kelp (Egregia menziesii), and bull kelp (Nereocystis luetkeana). Juveniles eat coralline algae, bacteria, and diatoms. They are found from the intertidal zone to water more than 180 m (590 ft) deep, but are most common between 6 and 40 m (20 and 131 ft).

== Shell description ==
The red abalone's shell length can reach a maximum of 31 cm (12 in), making it the largest species of abalone in the world.

The shell is large, thick, dome-shaped, and usually covered with barnacles, vegetation, or other marine growth making the color and shell sculpture difficult to determine. It is usually a dull brick red color externally. Typically the shell has three to four slightly raised oval holes or respiratory pores, although specimens with no holes and others with more than four have been found. These holes collectively make up what is known as the selenizone which form as the shell grows. The inside of the shell appears polished and is strongly iridescent. A central, prominent muscle scar is easily visible in the shells of most Red Abalone, marking the location at which Haliotis rufescen's strong columellar muscle attaches.

This species was used as the subject in a study of the microscopic development of nacre.

== Tentacles, foot and epipdodium ==
Below the edge of the shell, the black epipodium and tentacles can be seen. The underside of the foot is yellowish white in color.

== Sex ratio ==
Female members of dioecious molluscan species have been known to be more common than males. In populations that experience human predation, this difference can be exacerbated, as is the case with populations of Haliotis rufescens. From 1972-1973, researchers studying red abalone populations at Point Cabrillo Lighthouse Station and Van Damme State Park found that the level at which human predation occurs can have profound effects on the age class structure of each population. For many years, the abalone at Van Damme were heavily fished and the population structure reflected a notable lack of larger, older individuals. At Point Cabrillo, abalone harvesting had halted for some time, and populations of red abalone showed the development of a natural age class structure and sex ratio.

== Diseases ==
Red abalone are subject to a chronic, progressive and lethal disease: the withering syndrome or abalone wasting disease caused by Rickettsiales-like prokaryotes. This disease has had a historically grim effect on the species overall, decimating populations across their native habitat. Today, the effects of withering syndrome on current populations are poorly understood, but populations are still low. Elevated water temperatures have been shown to speed up the progression and transmission of withering syndrome in infected individuals. Exposed abalone experiencing starvation at 18.0 °C are far more likely to become infected than exposed individuals at 12.3 °C. This was shown in a 2005 study which was the first to indicate that temperature has a significant effect on Rickettsiales-like, prokaryote induced wasting syndrome transmission.

== History of human use ==
Red abalone has been used since prehistoric times—red abalone shells have been found in Channel Island archaeological sites dated to nearly 12,000 years old. Red abalone middens—refuse deposits where red abalone shells are a major constituent—are abundant in archaeological sites of the Northern Channel Islands dated between about 7500 and 3500 years ago. The Native American Chumash peoples also harvested this species along the Central California coast in the pre-contact era. The Chumash and other California Indians also used red abalone shells to make a variety of fishhooks, beads, ornaments, and other artifacts.

== History of diseases ==
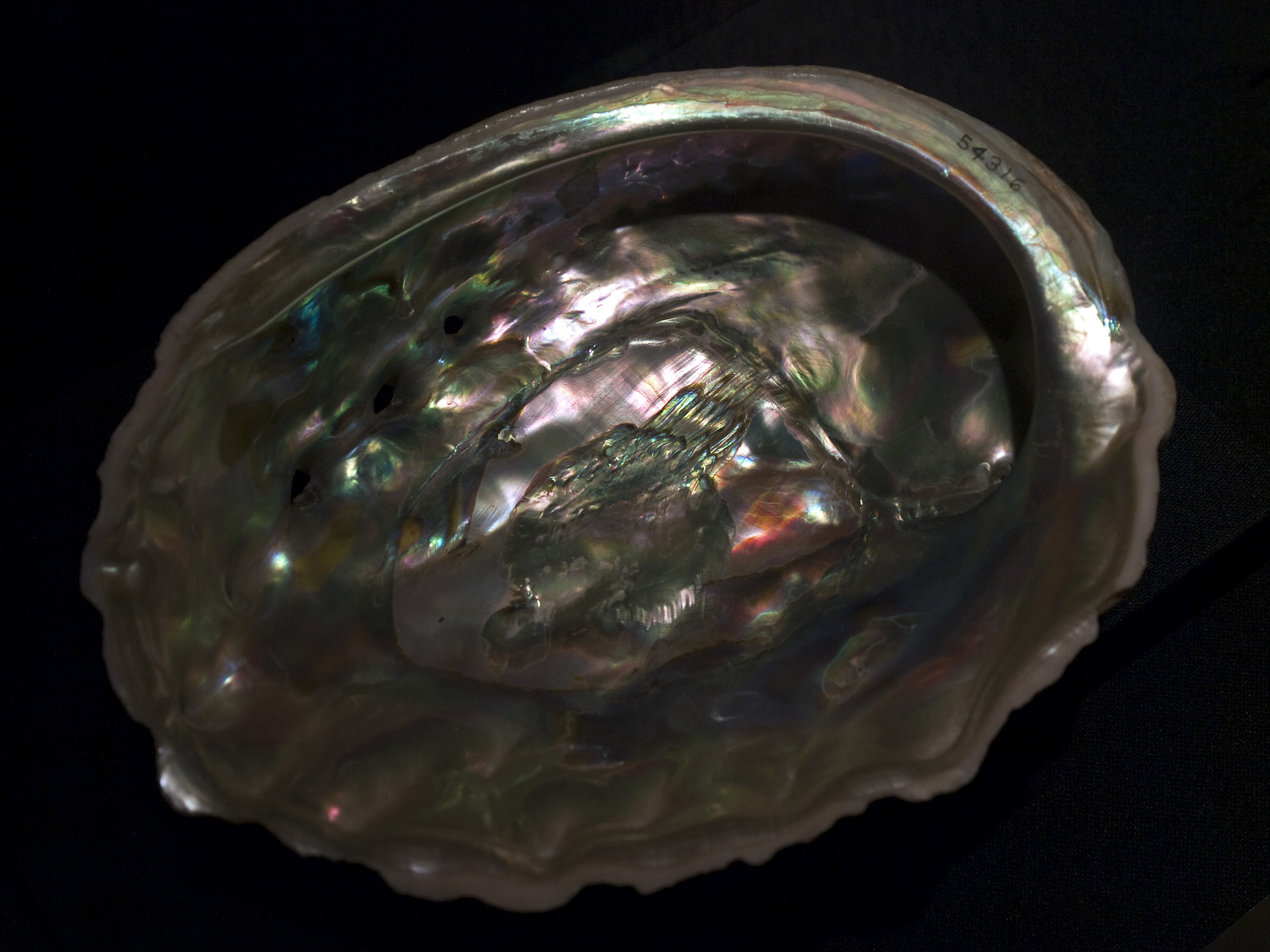
Inner view of the shell of a red abalone.

In the 1980s, an employee of the California Department of Fish and Wildlife who was privately farming abalone in California imported some South African abalone (Haliotis midae) and failed to quarantine them. The non-native polychaete worm Terebrasabella heterouncinata was introduced the abalone. This worm escaped into the ocean at Cayucos, California, where an abalone farm had long been established. It also entered the wild at many other sites. Scientists at the University of California, Santa Barbara and the Department of Fish and Wildlife joined the staff of the abalone farm and many volunteers to eradicate the pest.

Shortly after this, another disease of abalone appeared on Santa Cruz Island. It spread to the other Channel Islands of California and to the mainland of California. This bacterial disease proved to be devastating to both wild and farmed populations. It was named "withering syndrome" because the abalone starved to death even when food was plentiful. This was because the bacterium infested the digestive tract of the abalone and prevented digestion and absorption of kelp, the abalone's primary food source. The bacterium is a member of the family Rickettsiaceae.

Coincidentally, withering syndrome first appeared a few years after H. midae were imported into California, near Smugglers Cove on Santa Cruz Island, adjacent to the area where seaweed was harvested for an abalone farm at Port Hueneme, California. Its spread was aided by the Department of Fish and Game, which planted infected abalone into the wild north of Point Conception.

This bacterium attacks several species of abalone. It causes the viscera and foot muscle to atrophy, causing lethargy and starvation. The infected abalone cannot move along the substrate or right itself when upended. The disease causes many deaths, but it is not always fatal.

Withering syndrome, overfishing, and habitat loss has been responsible for the listing of black abalone and white abalone as Endangered Species. The United States Fish and Wildlife Service will begin a program to reintroduce abalone. Withering syndrome has struck all the abalone farms in California at one time or another, and has also been spread to Iceland and Ireland by the export of infected California Red Abalone, H. rufescens.

Abalone exported to Israel before H. midae were imported to California were not reported to have withering syndrome. Black abalone, red abalone, green abalone, white abalone, and two other species of abalone have virtually disappeared from Southern California because of historic overfishing and recently withering foot syndrome, while the Northern California populations have remained more numerous because of the colder waters. Green abalone and white abalone are now not common in Northern California due to overfishing, whereas they were once numerous in Southern California, and black abalone may become extinct in the near future.

=== Farming ===
Because of the destruction of most wild populations, abalone farming has become a booming business. Unlike some aquaculture operations, the farming of abalone is considered to be a form of sustainable agriculture. Few chemicals are used in the process and the abalone are fed locally harvested kelp, which promptly grows back in abundance. Some algae is grown for the purpose, as well.

=== Wild harvest ===
In 1916, documentation of the modern California fishery began. Fishing for these abalone populations peaked in the 1950s and 1960s and was followed by a decline in all five abalone species, red, green, pink, white, and black. Prior to this point, the fishery seemed sustainable with the increase in species that could be fished and the expansion of fishing areas. Disease and the recovery of sea otter populations contributed to the decline of the abalone, and the California Fish and Game Commission ended fishing for abalone in 1997.

In Northern California, commercial fishing was only legal for three years during World War II. As a result, a recreational fishery still exists in northern California. Because scuba diving to harvest abalone is banned, the fishery consists of shore pickers searching the rocks at low tide, and free divers using breath-hold diving to search for them. This essentially creates a reserve for the abalone in the water below 30 ft (9 m), where few divers are skilled enough to go. Currently, the minimum legal size is 7 in (18 cm), but a moratorium has been in effect since 2017.
