= Point Conception Light =

Lighthouse in Santa Barbara County, California

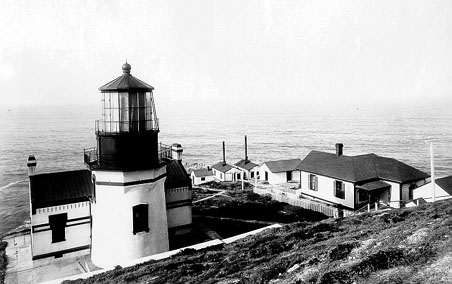
- Point Conception Light by U.S. Coast Guard Archive
- Location: Point Conception; California; United States
- Coordinates: 34°26′55.51″N 120°28′14.71″W

Tower
- Constructed: 1856 (first)
- Foundation: stone basement
- Construction: stucco, brick and wooden tower
- Automated: 1973
- Height: 52 feet (16 m)
- Shape: cylindrical tower with lantern behind fog signal building
- Markings: white tower, black lantern, greenish lantern roof
- Operator: United States Coast Guard
- Heritage: National Register of Historic Places listed place
- Fog signal: continuous blast every 30s.

Light
- First lit: 1882 (current)
- Focal height: 133 feet (41 m)
- Lens: First order Fresnel lens Now on display (original), VRB-25 (current)
- Range: 20 nautical miles (37 km; 23 mi)
- Characteristic: Fl W 30s.
- Point Conception Light Station
- U.S. National Register of Historic Places
- U.S. Historic district
- Nearest city: Lompoc, California
- Area: 29 acres (12 ha)
- NRHP reference No.: 81000176
- Added to NRHP: February 25, 1981

Point Conception Light is a lighthouse in Santa Barbara County, California, on Point Conception at the west entrance of the Santa Barbara Channel, California. One of the earliest California lighthouses, it is listed on the National Register of Historic Places on the Gaviota Coast.

== History ==
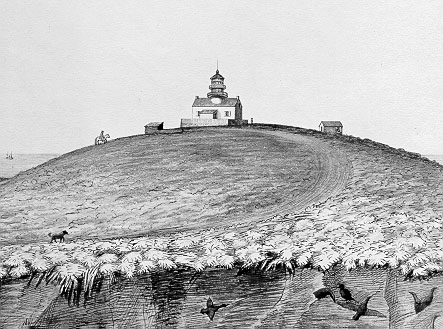
Pen & Ink Drawing – U.S. Coast Guard

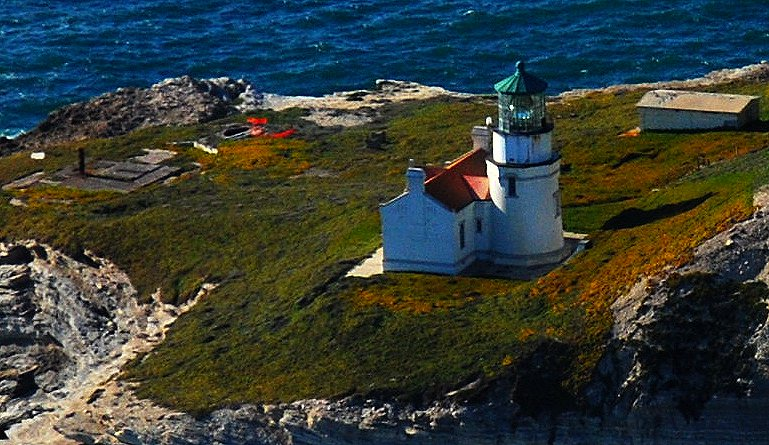
Aerial view, 2009

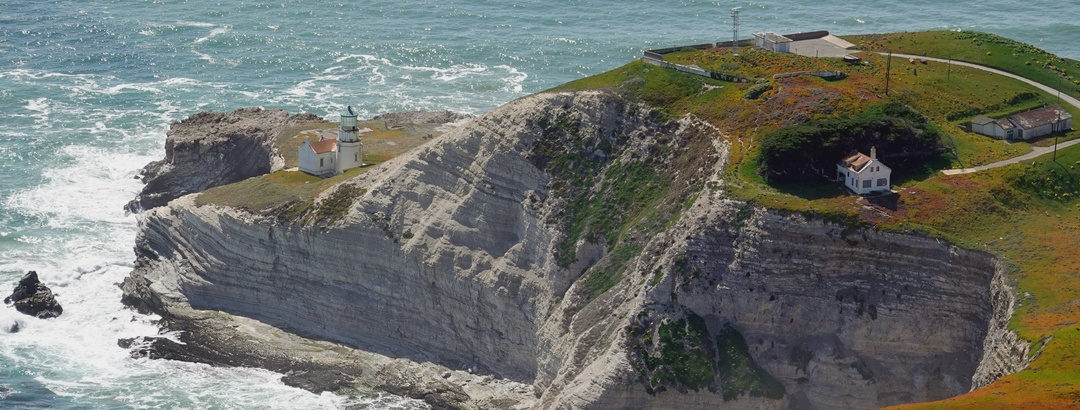
Point Conception Light main grounds

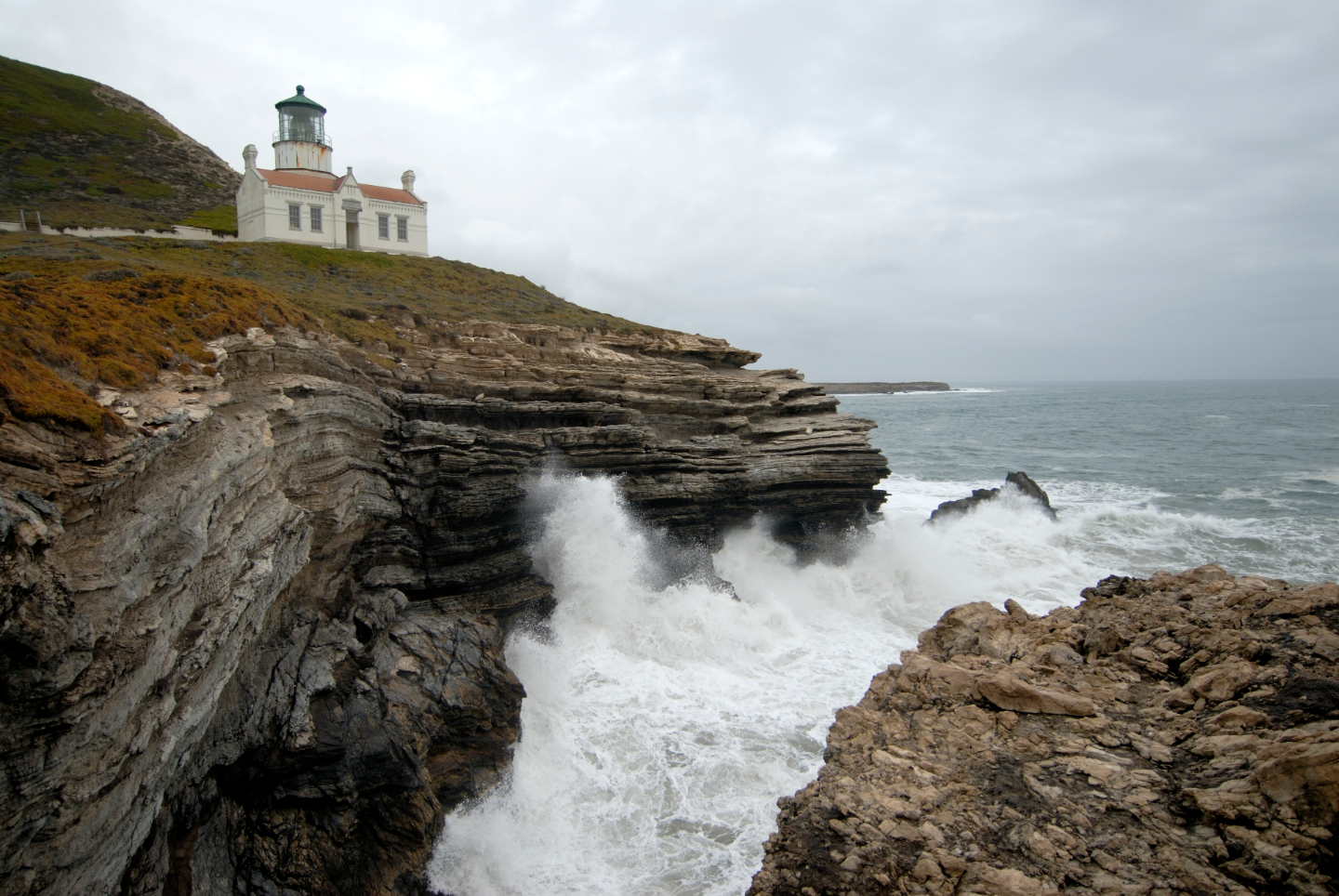
Point Conception Light was moved to a bluff 133 feet (41 m) above the Pacific Ocean in 1881.

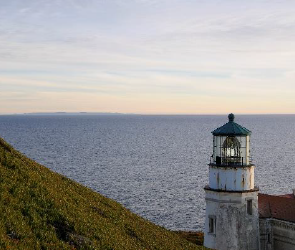
Point Conception Light overlooking the Pacific Ocean.

Juan Rodríguez Cabrillo sailed along the California coast in search for glory and gold. On October 18, 1542, he encountered heavy winds upon rounding the Point and was forced to turn back to San Miguel Island where he died. Second-in-command Bartolomé Ferrer took charge and again tried to round the Point but he was also unsuccessful.

The Point was named Punta de la Limpia Concepcion by Sebastián Vizcaíno in 1602, who was the next Spanish sailor to venture the Pacific waters along the California coast after Juan Cabrillo. The 1835 experience of the sailing ship Pilgrim, which was damaged and nearly capsized in a sudden change of weather here, is typical of boaters even today.

It was here at Point Conception in 1856, that the lighthouse was built high on the sandstone cliffs, above the location of the present lighthouse. The first order Fresnel lens and steel tower for the lighthouse were made in France at a cost of $65,068 and was transported around Cape Horn. A report indicates that the lighthouse was severely damaged during the Fort Tejon earthquake of January 9, 1857.

The lighthouse was moved in 1881 because the fog would be less likely to obscure the light, and was rebuilt from the top of the bluff to a mesa halfway down, 133 feet (41 m) above the Pacific Ocean. The light station was automated by the United States Coast Guard in 1973.

The lighthouse was used as the location for the film The Monster of Piedras Blancas (1959), and has appeared on two Toad the Wet Sprocket music videos: Come Back Down (Pale) and Walk on the Ocean (Fear).

In recent years Vandenberg Air Force Base restricts access from the northwest, and the Jack and Laura Dangermond Preserve restricts access from the adjoining land although a few people have reached the lighthouse by hiking west along the narrow rugged public beach several miles from the nearest road during low tide. Vandenberg Space Force base now has ownership of the land and the lighthouse.

== See also ==
- List of lighthouses in the United States
- Channel Islands National Marine Sanctuary
- Channel Islands of California

== Sources ==
- Shipwrecks, Smugglers and Maritime Mysteries, by Wheeler & Kallman, 1986
