= Charles Russell Orcutt =

- Born: April 27, 1864; Hartland, Vermont
- Died: August 25, 1929 (aged 65); Haiti
- Scientific career
- Fields: Botany
- Workplaces: San Diego Natural History Museum
- Author abbrev. (botany): Orcutt

Charles Russell Orcutt or C.R. Orcutt (born 27 April 1864 in Hartland, Vermont; died in Haiti 25 August 1929) was a noted naturalist sometimes called "cactus man" because on many expeditions he found new species of cacti. He was active in the San Diego Society of Natural History, promoting the foundation of a local natural history museum, now the San Diego Natural History Museum. He edited the American Botanist (1898–1900), American Plants (1907–1910), and Western Scientist (1884–1919) and in his collecting work, made contributions to the fields of botany and malacology. In 1908 Orcutt issued an exsiccata-like series called Californian and Mexican plants.

== Biography ==
Orcutt was the eldest of five children of Herman Chandler Orcutt and Eliza Eastin Gray Orcutt. In 1879, the Orcutt family moved to San Diego, where his father, a horticulturalist, opened a nursery near the ruins of the San Diego Mission de Alcalá. Orcutt worked with his father, collecting plant specimens in the San Diego area and Baja California. He traveled there with Charles Christopher Parry, Cyrus Pringle, and Marcus E. Jones, with whom he learned to properly catalog, collect, and preserve specimens. The genus Orcuttia and variants are named for him. In 1884 he began The West American Scientist, which he irregularly published until 1919. He began to be referred to as witty and as a hopeless eccentric. The year 1892 proved significant for him as his father died and he married a doctor from New York named Olive Lucy Eddy. Eddy was among the first women to earn a Doctor of Medicine degree at the University of Michigan’s Homœopathic Medical College at Ann Arbor, in 1882. Her medical practice did much to support them, and with her sister Clara she published a magazine titled Out of Doors For Women. The couple had four children.

At first Orcutt primarily collected plant specimens, but his interest began to shift from botany to conchology (Eugene Coan identified Charles Orcutt as a “pioneer malacologist”). He is credited with discovering at least three new Mollusca: Black abalone subspecies Haliotis cracherodii bonita and Haliotis cracherodii rosea, and Haliotis corrugata subspecies diegoensis. A new genus he found was named after him: Coralliochama orcutti. He went on expeditions, often alone, to El Sauzal, Punta Banda, and as far south as Misión San Fernando Rey de España de Velicatá. He shipped a huge collection of fossils he gathered in San Quintín Bay to the American Museum of Natural History in New York. His Baja trips continued through 1919. He also traveled in Texas, Arizona, Mexico and Central America.

By 1922, Charles seldom returned home, spending time in Jamaica and Haiti. He maintained a residence in Jamaica in 1927 and in 1929 the Smithsonian Institution funded him for work in Haiti. After seven months of work there, he was exhausted and ill and stayed with an American embassy official in Jérémie until he was hospitalized.

Charles Russell Orcutt died of malaria on the morning of 25 August 1929. He is buried in Port-au-Prince.

Orcutt is commemorated in the scientific name of a species of lizard, Sceloporus orcutti.
