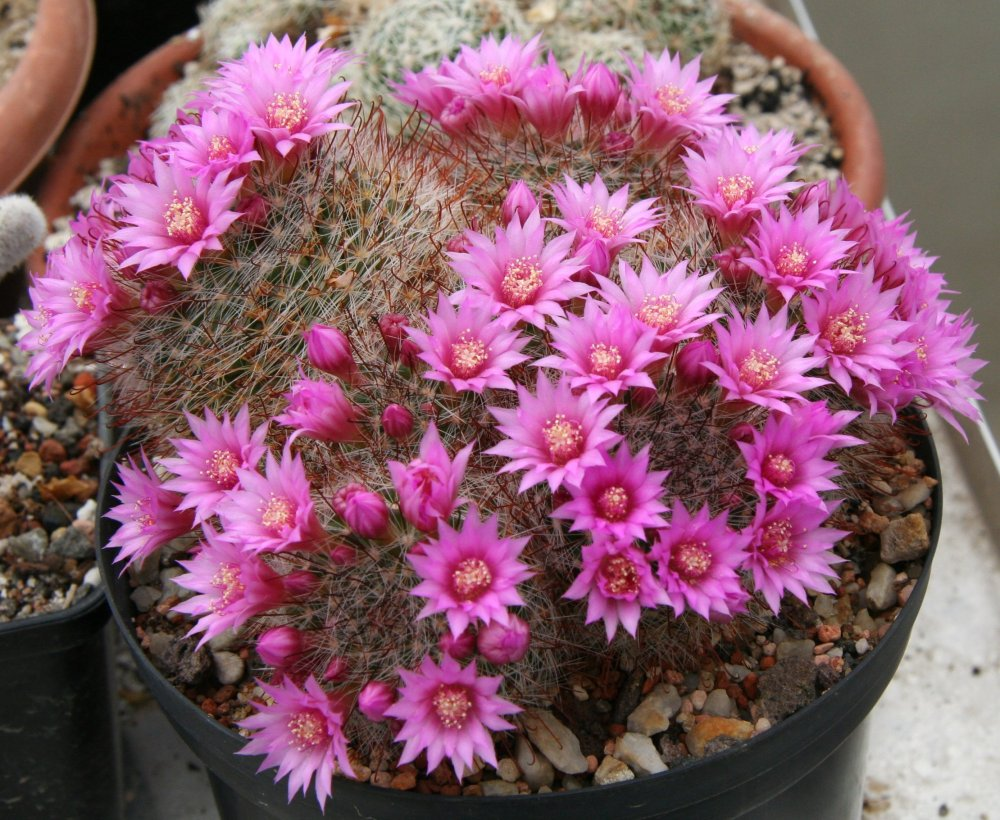

Conservation status
- Critically Endangered (IUCN 3.1)

Scientific classification
- Kingdom: Plantae
- Clade: Tracheophytes
- Clade: Angiosperms
- Clade: Eudicots
- Order: Caryophyllales
- Family: Cactaceae
- Subfamily: Cactoideae
- Genus: Mammillaria
- Species: M. zeilmanniana

Binomial name
- Mammillaria zeilmanniana Boed.

= Mammillaria zeilmanniana =

Species of cactus from Mexico

Mammillaria zeilmanniana is a species of cactus. It is endemic to Mexico, where it is known only from Guanajuato. It grows in a narrow canyon usually near water where there is high humidity, its total population is fewer than 250 individuals. It is threatened by illegal collection for the horticultural trade. Recent studies link this species to Mammillaria crinita.

== Description ==
This small cactus grows up to 12 cm high and up to 8 cm wide. When young this species has wooly areoles though when mature it has 13–15 radiant spine and 4 central spines one being hooked. The flowers are 2 cm across and usually occur in a ring along the top of the plant, var. albiflora is a variation not known to occur in the wild.

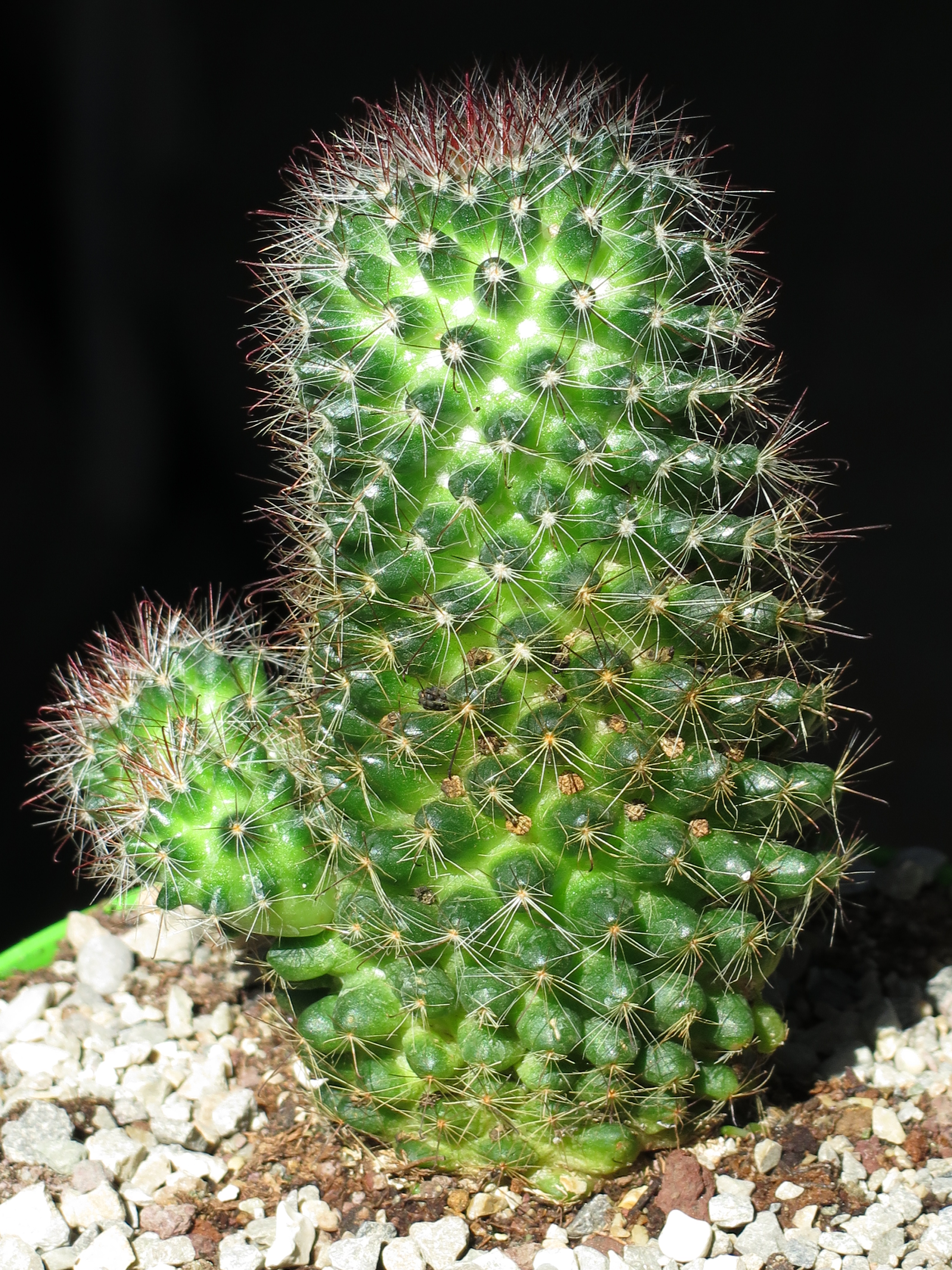
A forked specimen

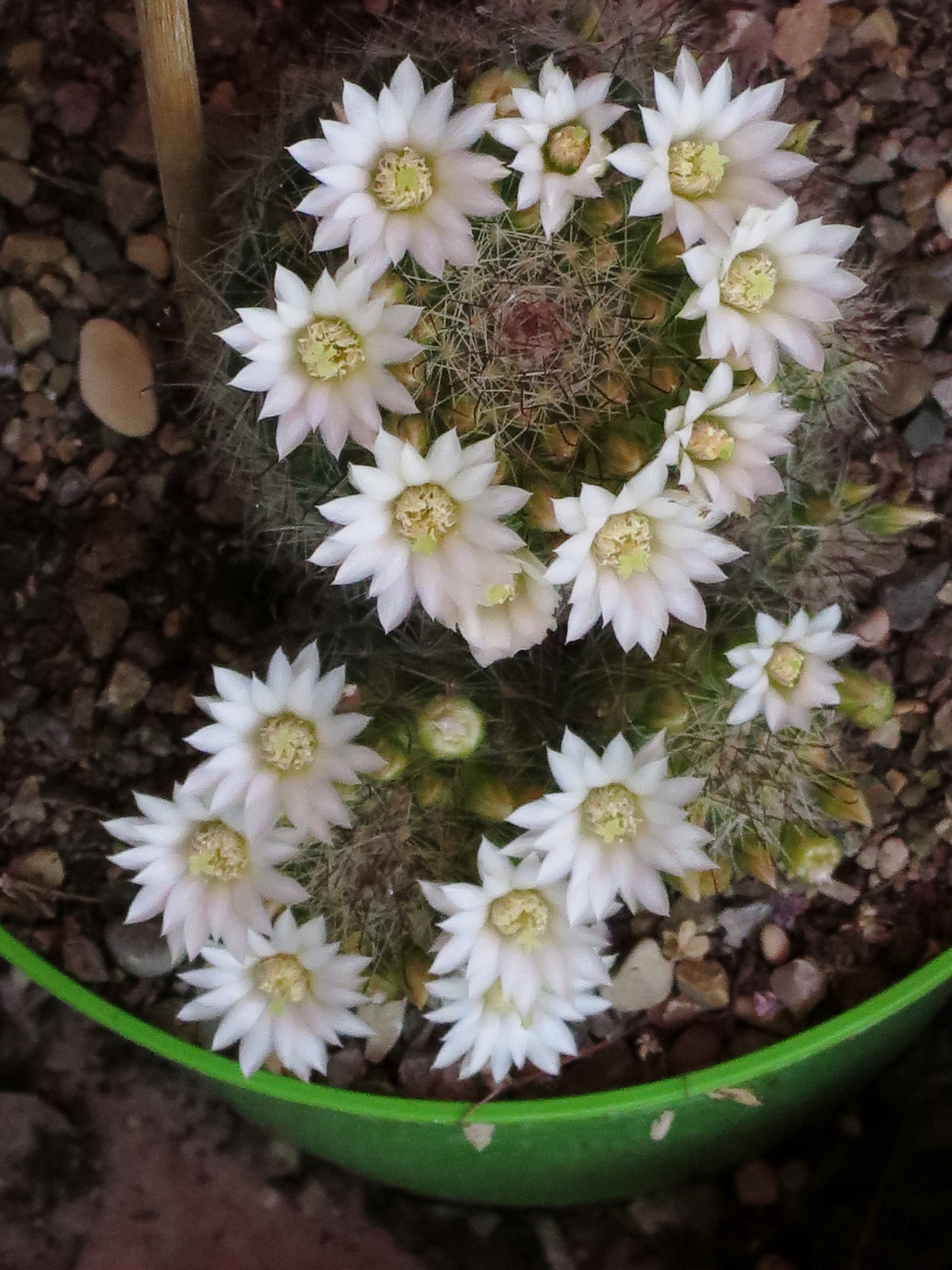
var. albiflora
