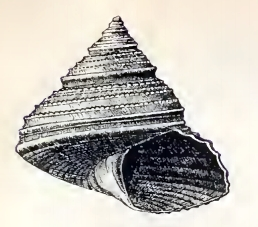
- Original drawing of a shell of Calliostoma turbinum

Scientific classification
- Kingdom: Animalia
- Phylum: Mollusca
- Class: Gastropoda
- Subclass: Vetigastropoda
- Order: Trochida
- Family: Calliostomatidae
- Subfamily: Calliostomatinae
- Genus: Calliostoma
- Species: C. turbinum

Binomial name
- Calliostoma turbinum Dall, 1895

= Calliostoma turbinum =

Species of gastropod

Calliostoma turbinum is a species of sea snail, a marine gastropod mollusk in the family Calliostomatidae.

== Description ==
The shell is small, turbinate and thin. The nacre shines with a peculiarly coppery luster. The apex is white. The periphery is painted with purple-brown flammules and the spirals are more or less articulated with the same color. The columella is white.

== Distribution ==
This species occurs in the Pacific Ocean from Point Conception to San Diego, California.
