= Jack and Laura Dangermond Preserve =

Nature reserve in Santa Barbara County California

- Dangermond Preserve
- Location within California
- Nearest city: Lompoc, California
- Coordinates: 34.560°N 120.402°W
- Area: 24,000 acres (9,700 ha)
- Established: December 2017
- Governing body: The Nature Conservancy
- Website: www.dangermondpreserve.org

The Jack and Laura Dangermond Preserve is a nature reserve in Santa Barbara County California managed by The Nature Conservancy. The land is host to a variety of wildlife species, as it touches two major terrestrial and two major marine biomes. Animals from both southern and northern California mix territories in this area.

== Location ==
The preserve is in south-west Santa Barbara County, California, with 8 miles (13 km) of coastline along the Gaviota Coast bracketing Point Conception and 24,000 inland acres (9,700 ha). It is adjacent to protected marine areas. The land touches the south and east sides of Jalama Beach County Park.

== History ==
The preserve was created in 2017 by a donation from Jack and Laura Dangermond. The $165 million donation to The Nature Conservancy to secure the land was the largest the organization has ever received.

The reserve was included in the Prescribed Fire Training Exchange (TREX) held November 12–19, 2022 with a controlled fire by firefighters to clear away dead undergrowth and other debris. The training on how to safely conduct prescribed burns, seminars on local fire ecology, and tribal burning included Santa Barbara County Fire Department, employees of the Santa Ynez Band of Chumash Indians, The Nature Conservancy, University of California Agriculture and Natural Resources, Vandenberg Space Force Base, scientists, ranchers, students, researchers, and land managers.

== Ecology ==
Black abalone (Haliotis cracherodii), California’s state seashell and federally endangered since 2009, were successfully translocated to Dangermond Preserve's protected coastline in 2023 after their near extirpation by commercial and recreational harvesting, and withering abalone syndrome.

== See also ==
- California montane chaparral and woodlands
- Flora of the Transverse Ranges
- List of beaches in California
- List of California state parks
