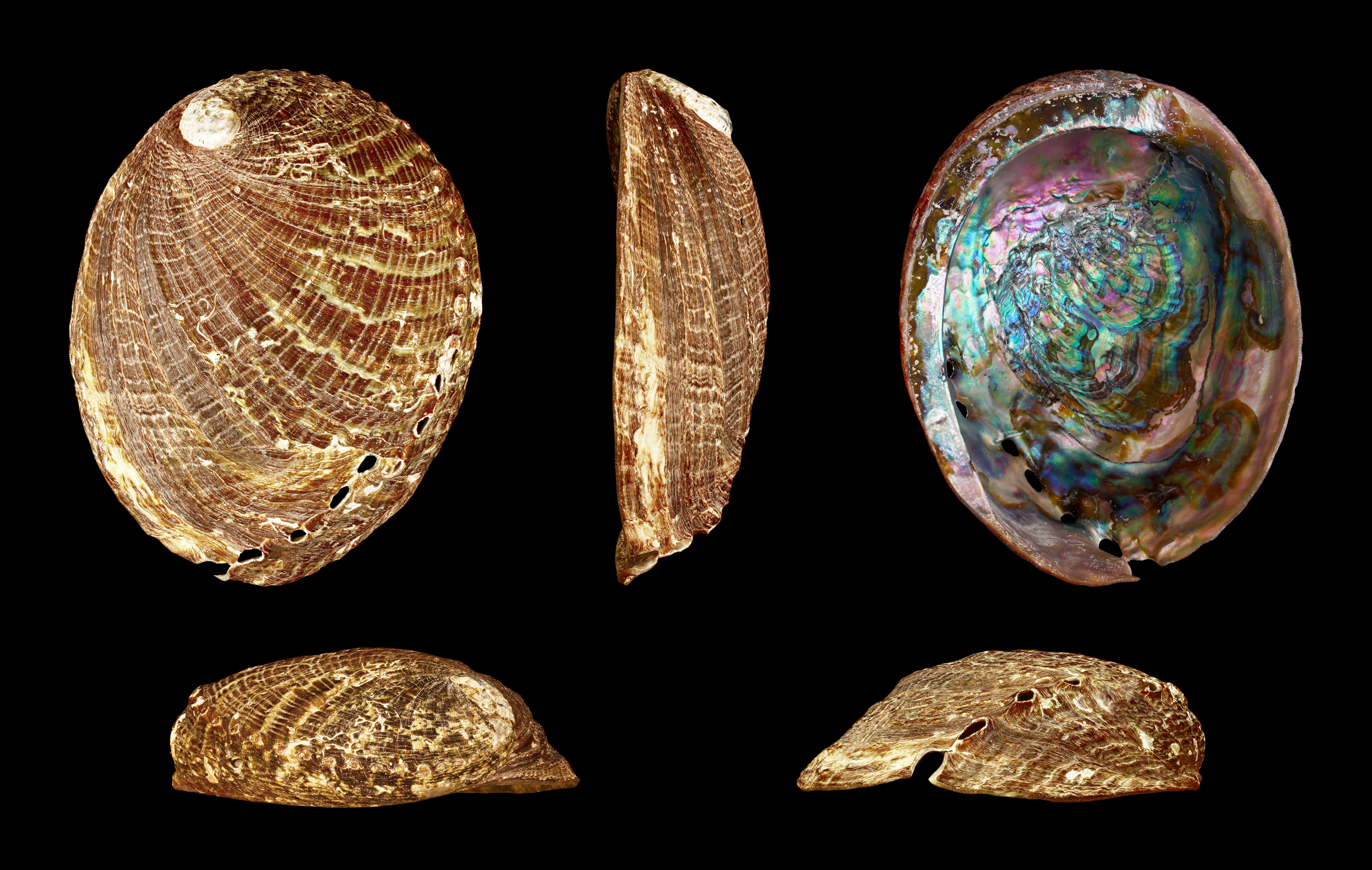
- Five views of a shell of Haliotis fulgens

Conservation status
- Critically Endangered (IUCN 3.1)

- Vulnerable (NatureServe)

Scientific classification
- Kingdom: Animalia
- Phylum: Mollusca
- Class: Gastropoda
- Subclass: Vetigastropoda
- Order: Lepetellida
- Superfamily: Haliotoidea
- Family: Haliotidae
- Genus: Haliotis
- Species: H. fulgens

Binomial name
- Haliotis fulgens Philippi, 1845

Synonyms
- Haliotis planilirata Reeve, 1846; Haliotis splendens Reeve, 1846; Haliotis (Haliotis) fulgens Philippi, 1845; Haliotis (Haliotis) revea Bartsch, P., 1940 (nomen nudum)

= Haliotis fulgens =

Species of gastropod

Haliotis fulgens, commonly called the green abalone, is a species of large sea snail, a marine gastropod mollusc in the family Haliotidae, the abalone. The shell of this species is usually brown, and is marked with many low, flat-topped ribs which run parallel to the five to seven open respiratory pores that are elevated above the shell's surface. The inside of the shell is an iridescent blue and green.

The range of Haliotis fulgens includes southern California and most of the Pacific coast of Baja California, Mexico.

== Subspecies ==
- H. f. fulgens Philippi, 1845
- H. f. guadalupensis Talmadge, 1964
- H. f. turveri Bartsch, 1942

== Description ==
The size of the adult shell of this species varies between 75 mm (3.0 in) and 255 mm (10.0 in). "The large, oval, quite convex shell is sculptured all over with equal rounded cords or lirae. Its coloration is reddish-brown. Generally five holes are open. The form is oval. The back of the shell is quite convex. It is solid, but thinner than Haliotis rufescens. The outer surface has a uniform dull reddish-brown color. It is sculptured with rounded spiral lirae, nearly equal in size. These number 30 to 40 on the upper surface. At the row of the holes there is an angle. The surface below it slopes almost perpendicularly to the columellar edge, and has about midway an obtuse keel. The spire does not project above the general curve of the back. The inner surface is dark, mostly blue and green with dark coppery stains, pinkish within the spire. The muscle impression is painted in a peculiar and brilliant pattern, like a peacock's tail. The columellar plate is wide, flat, and slopes inward. The cavity of the spire is small, almost concealed. The about five perforations are rather small, elevated and circular."

The epipodium is a "ruffle" of tissue along the side of the foot. The head and epipodial tentacles are olive green in this species, but the epipodial fringes are a mottled cream and brown color, with knobby tubercles scattered on the surface, and a frilly edge.

== Distribution ==
H. fulgens is endemic to the waters off the coast of southern California, from Point Conception, California, to Bahia Magdalena, Baja California Sur, Mexico.

== Habitat ==
This species is found in shallow water on open/exposed coast from low intertidal to at least 30 feet (9 m) and perhaps as deep as 60 feet (18 m). Individuals are found in rock crevices, under rocks and other cryptic cavities. Like all abalone, green abalone are herbivores. They feed mostly on drift algae and prefer fleshy red algae.

== Predators ==
Predators of this species include sea otters, starfish, large fishes, octopuses, and humans.

== Diseases ==
Green abalone are subject to a chronic, progressive and lethal disease: withering abalone syndrome or abalone wasting disease, leading to mass mortality.

== Reproduction ==
Green abalone have separate sexes and broadcast spawn from early summer through early fall. Maturity is reached at 2.4 to 5 inches (61–128 mm) length, or 5 to 7 years. Lifespan is up to 30 years or more.

== Threats and conservation ==
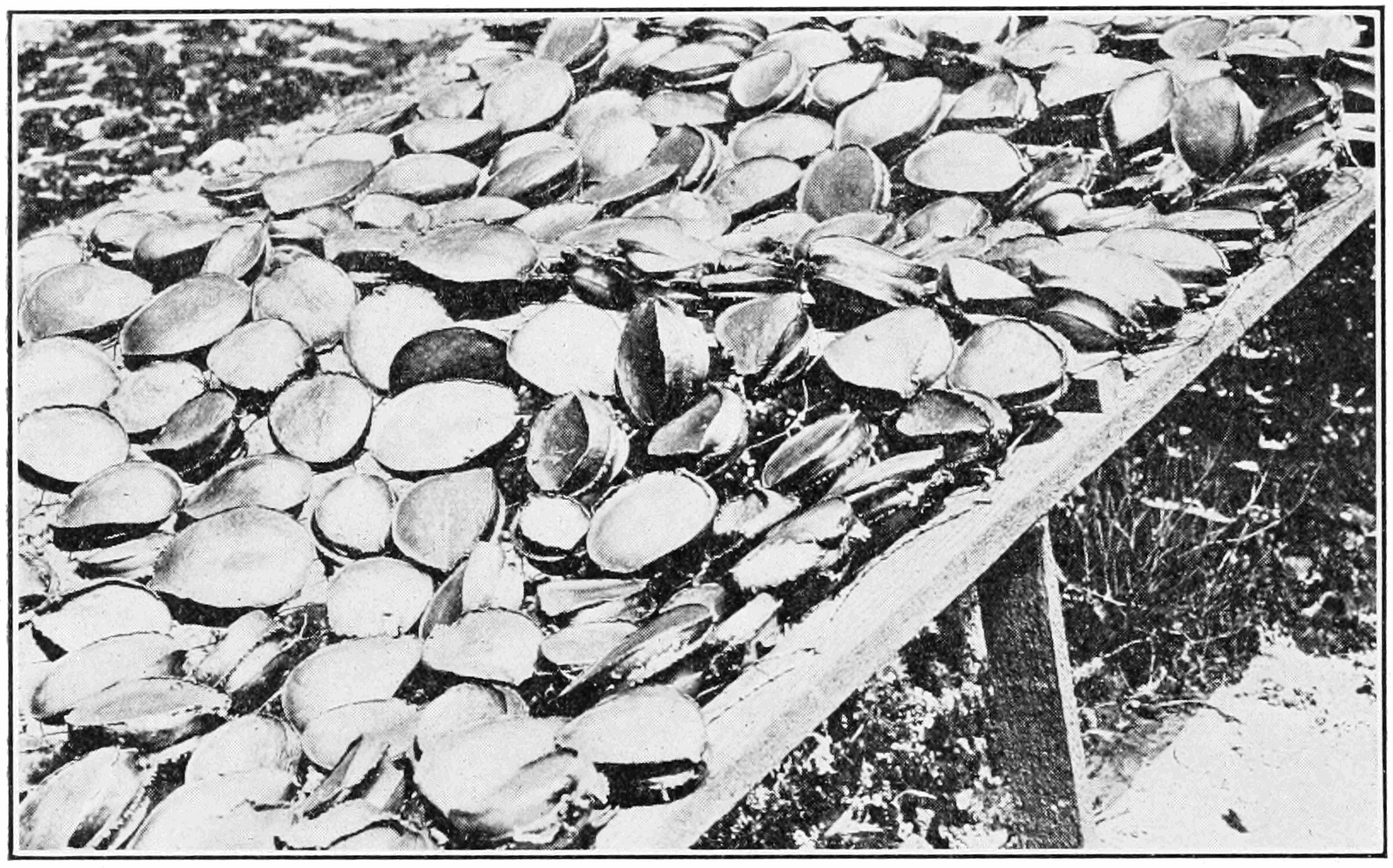
Sun dried meat of the green abalone on San Clemente Island in 1913

Green abalone are threatened by overharvesting and the withering abalone syndrome disease. California has a Abalone Recovery Management Plan to guide conservation efforts. They are a U.S. National Marine Fisheries Service species of concern. Species of concern are those species about which the U.S. Government's National Oceanic and Atmospheric Administration, National Marine Fisheries Service has some concerns regarding status and threats, but for which insufficient information is available to indicate a need to list the species under the U.S. Endangered Species Act.
