= Channel Islands National Marine Sanctuary =

Marine sanctuary in the Pacific Coast of Southern California

- IUCN category V (protected landscape/seascape)
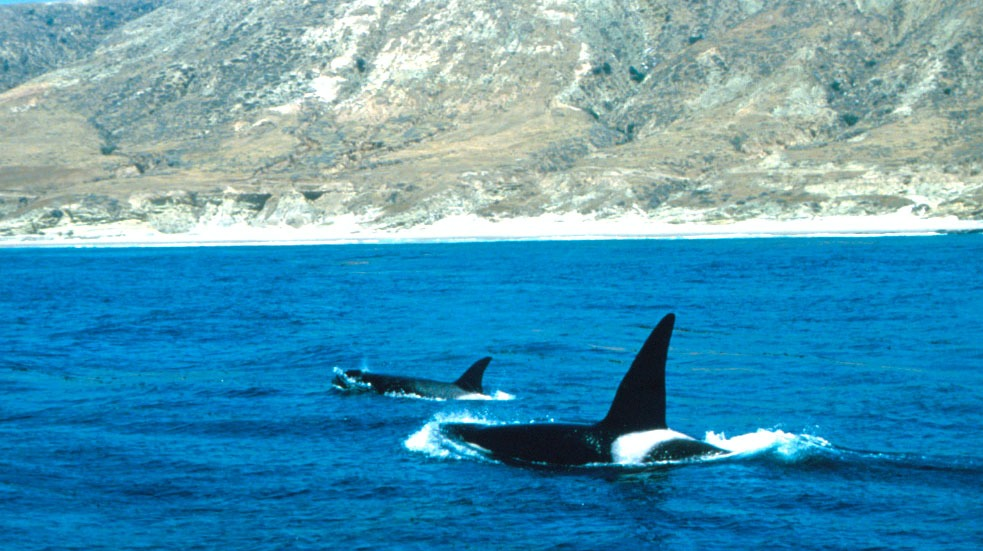
- Orcas off Santa Rosa Island

- Location within southern California Location within California Location within the United States
- Interactive map of Channel Islands National Marine Sanctuary
- Coordinates: 34°N 120°W
- Area: 1,470 sq mi (3,800 km^{2})
- Established: October 2, 1980; 45 years ago; Expanded 2007
- Governing body: National Oceanic and Atmospheric Administration
- Website: www.cinms.nos.noaa.gov

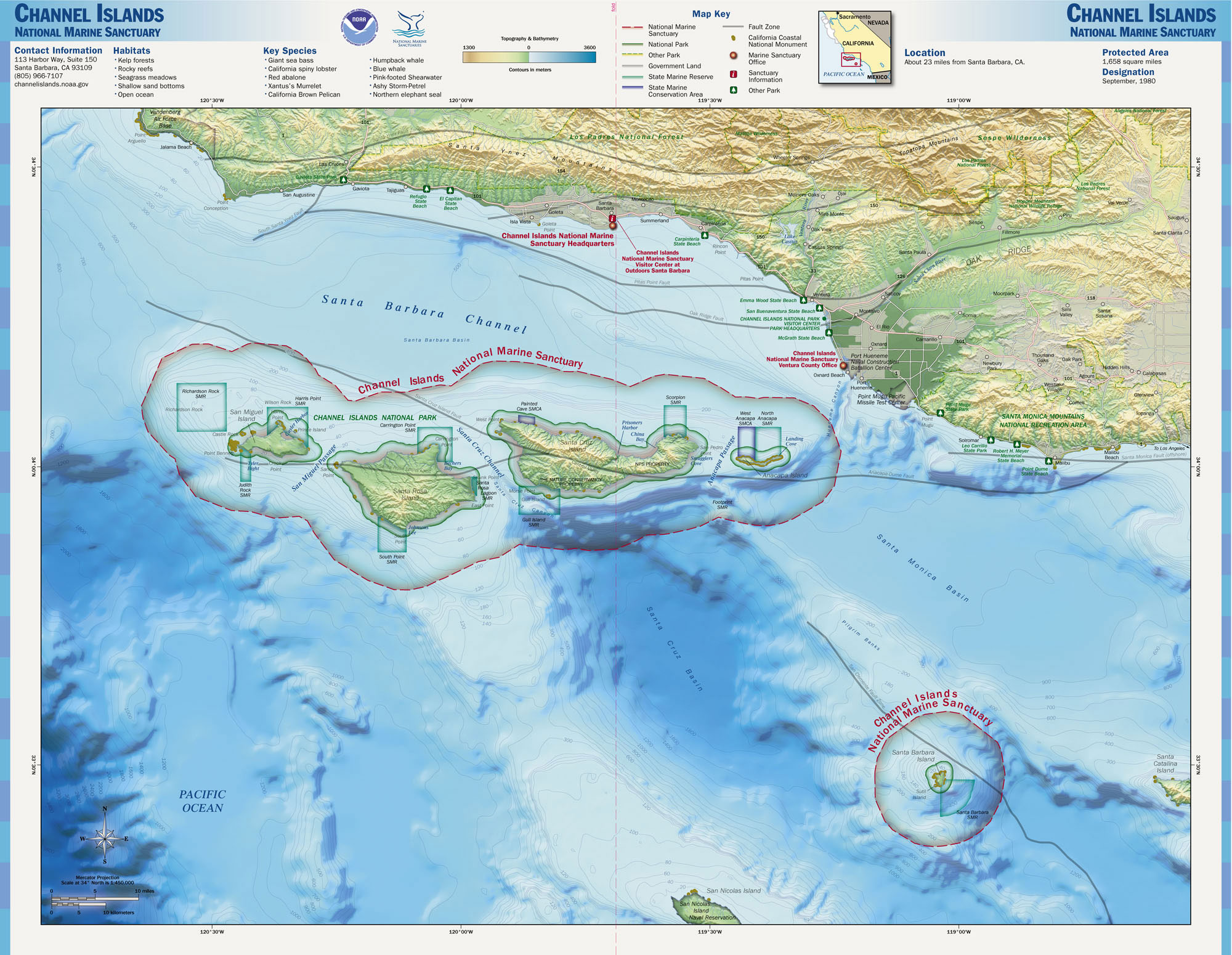
Map of Channel Islands sanctuary

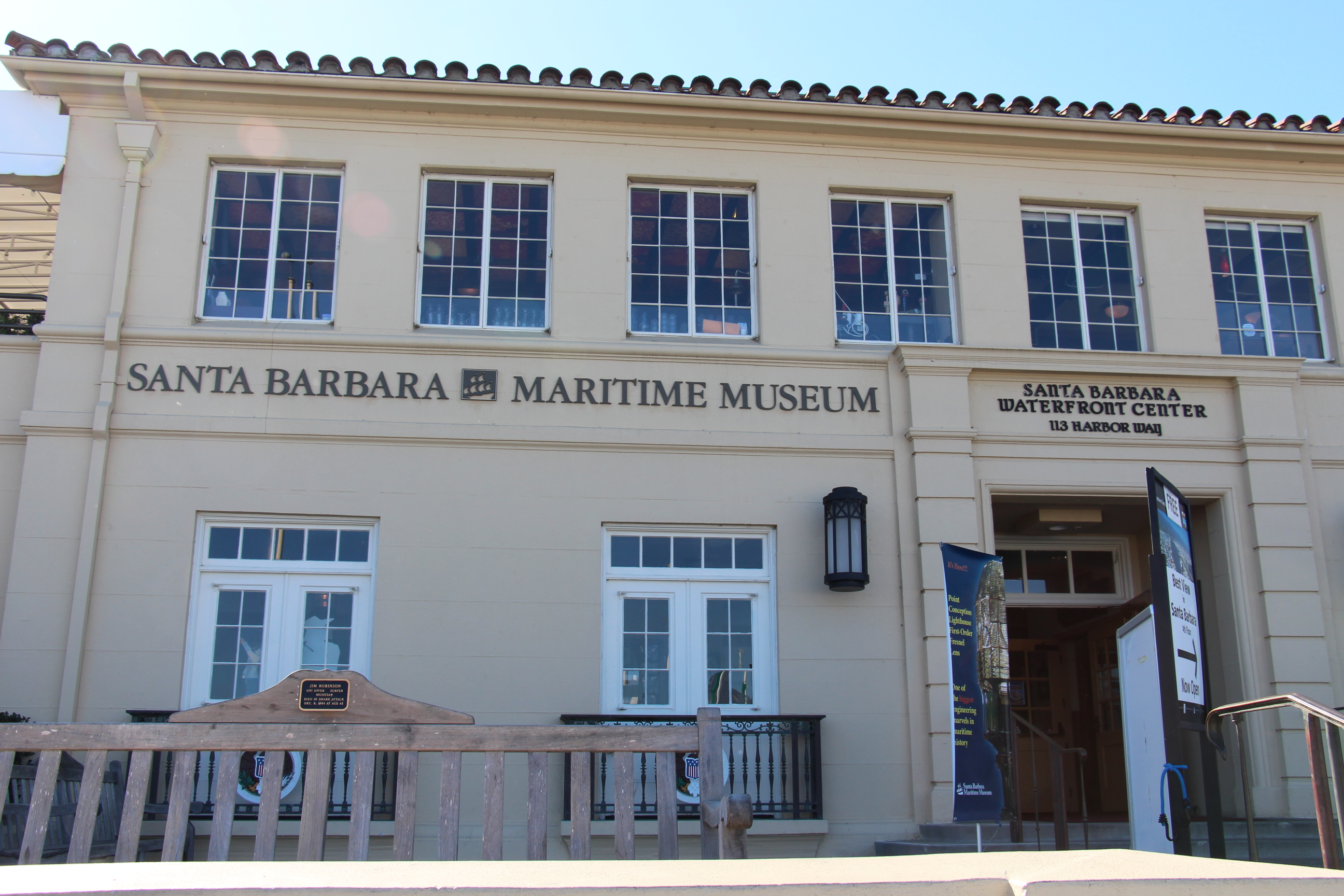
Santa Barbara Maritime Museum

The Channel Islands National Marine Sanctuary is a sanctuary off the coast of Santa Barbara and Ventura counties in Southern California 350 miles (563 km) south of San Francisco and 95 miles (153 km) north of Los Angeles. It was designated on October 2, 1980, by the National Oceanic and Atmospheric Administration and was expanded in 2007.

== Description ==
The sanctuary encompasses approximately 1,470 square miles (1,110 sq nmi; 3,807 km^{2}) of ocean waters around Anacapa, Santa Cruz, Santa Rosa, San Miguel and Santa Barbara Islands, extending from the mean high tide of these islands to 6 nautical miles (11 km; 6.9 mi) offshore, and surrounding Channel Islands National Park. It is part of the National Marine Sanctuary program under the administration of the National Oceanic and Atmospheric Administration (NOAA).

Its remote, isolated position at the confluence of two major ocean currents supports unique biodiversity and productivity. It is a special place for endangered species, sensitive habitats, historic shipwrecks, other maritime heritage artifacts, and living Chumash culture. Many valuable commercial and recreational activities thrive in the sanctuary, such as fishing, shipping, and tourism.

The United States Government designated the sanctuary because of its national significance as an area of exceptional natural beauty and resources, and due to heightened concerns following a 1969 oil spill in the Santa Barbara Channel. Protection of sanctuary resources is supported through research, education, conservation, and stewardship programs. The primary goal of the sanctuary is the protection of natural and cultural resources contained within its boundaries. The sanctuary is managed to promote ecosystem conservation, protect cultural resources, and support compatible human uses.

== Education ==
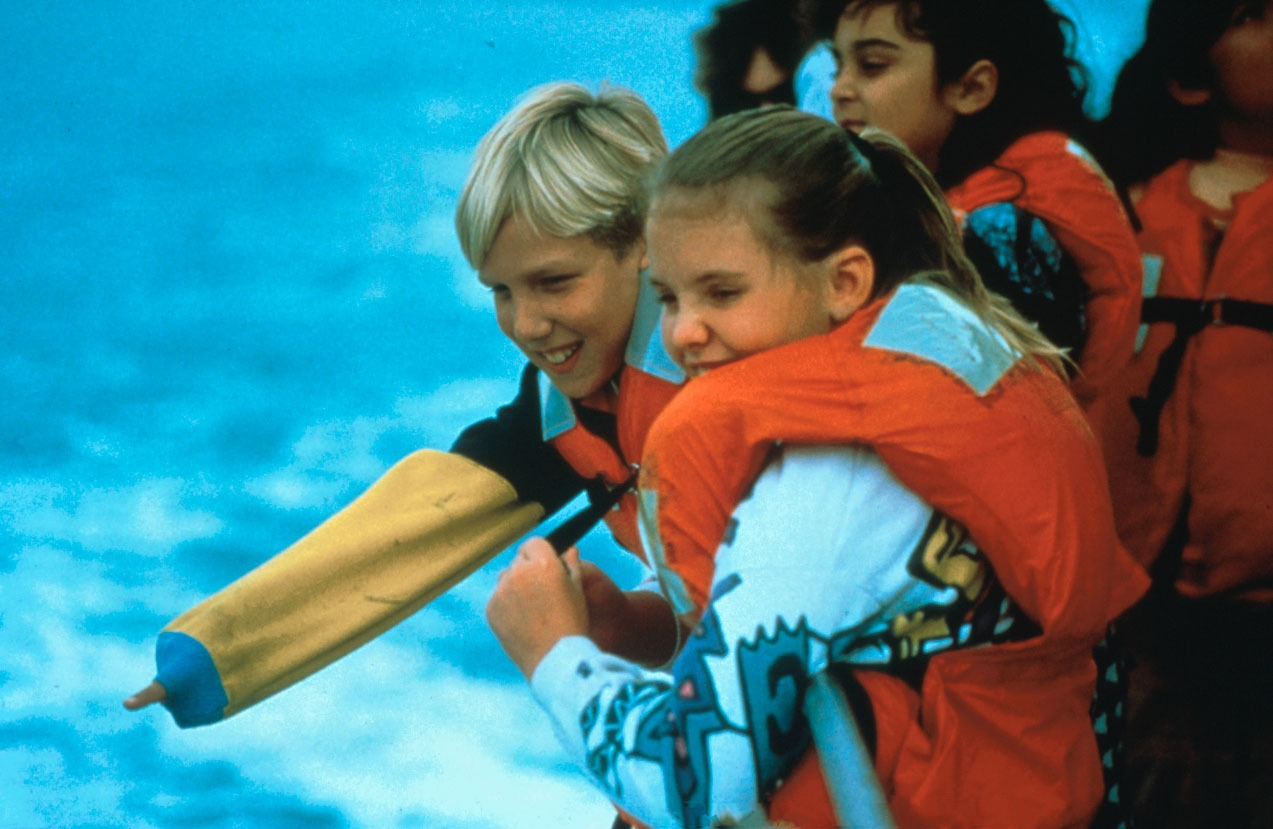
"Los Marineros" is a marine education program for children founded by the CINMS in 1987 and administered by the Santa Barbara Museum of Natural History.

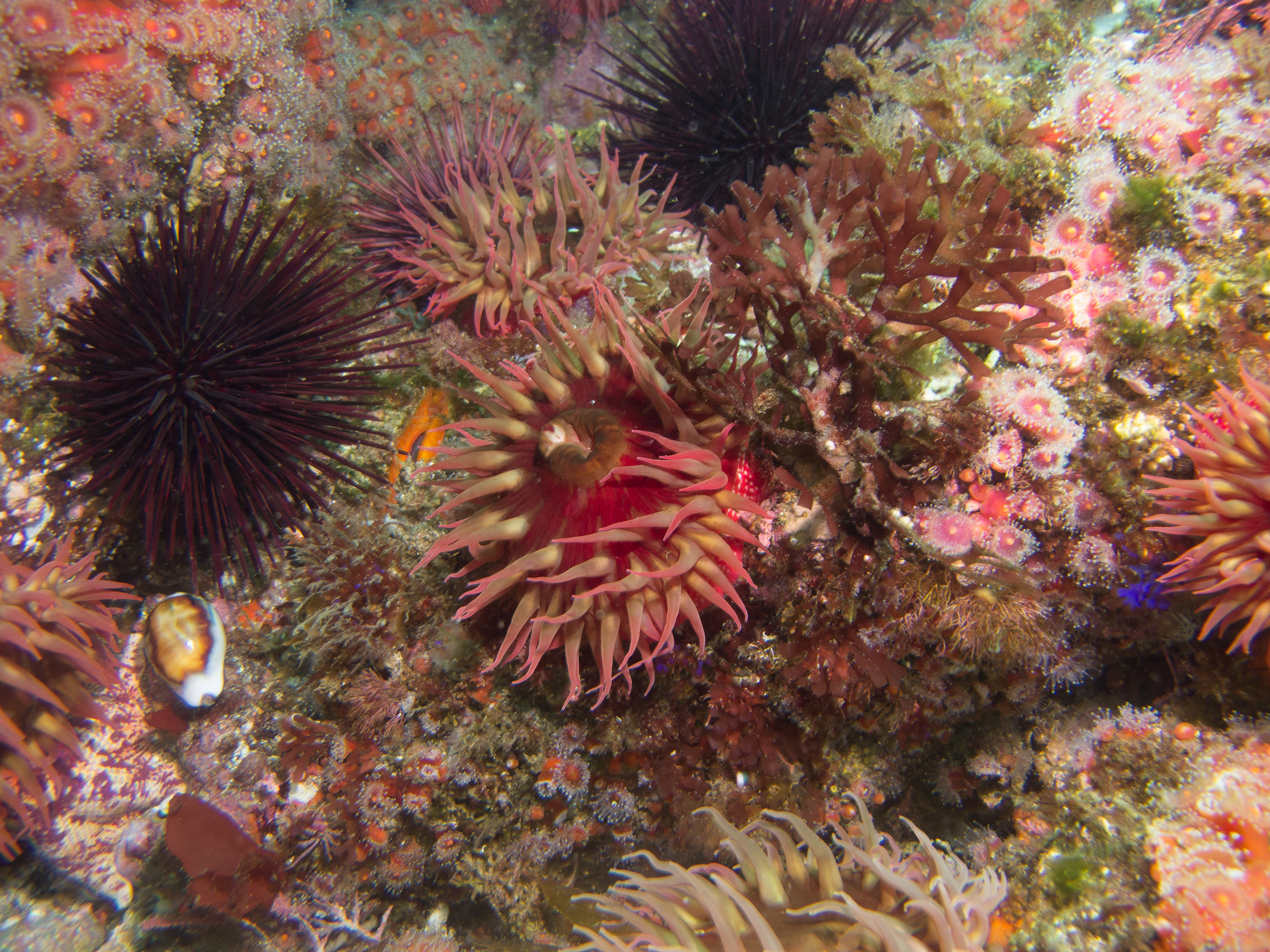
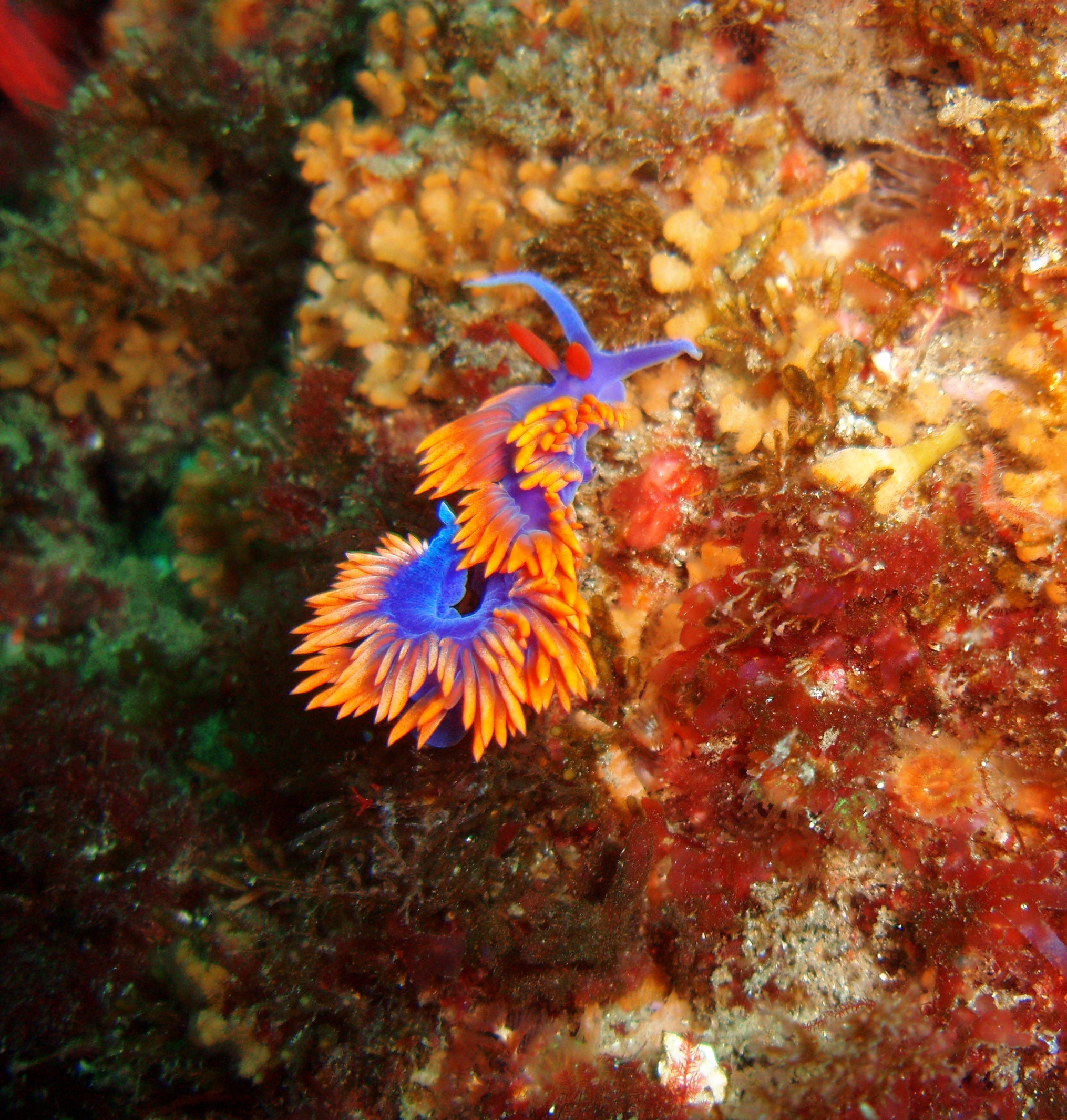
LEFT: Marine life off Santa Cruz Island. RIGHT: Spanish shawl nudibranch (Flabellina iodinea) in the sanctuary.

The Channel Islands National Marine Sanctuary is dedicated to education and outreach aiming to promote understanding, support, and participation in the protection and conservation of marine resources.

=== Visitors centers, education partners, and related organizations ===
The sanctuary's visitor center works to interpret the living and maritime heritage resources that are a part of the sanctuary.

=== Outreach products ===
The sanctuary distributes brochures and other resources such as posters, maps, and coloring books for the public mostly providing information about the biodiversity in the sanctuary as well as how to preserve it.

=== Students at Sea ===
The Students at Sea Program is addressed to high schools and college students. Participants explore different career pathways and learn how science is used to address different resource protection issues that threaten the health of the ocean.

=== Teachers at Sea ===
The Teachers at Sea Program is addressed to elementary school through high school teachers. They are involved in hands-on activities such as conducting plankton tows, viewing plankton under a video microscope, piloting remotely operated underwater vehicles, sampling water quality parameters such as pH and salinity and learning about current sanctuary research. The aim of the program is for participating teachers to have the tools and resources to then pass what they learn and experience on to their students.

== Research ==
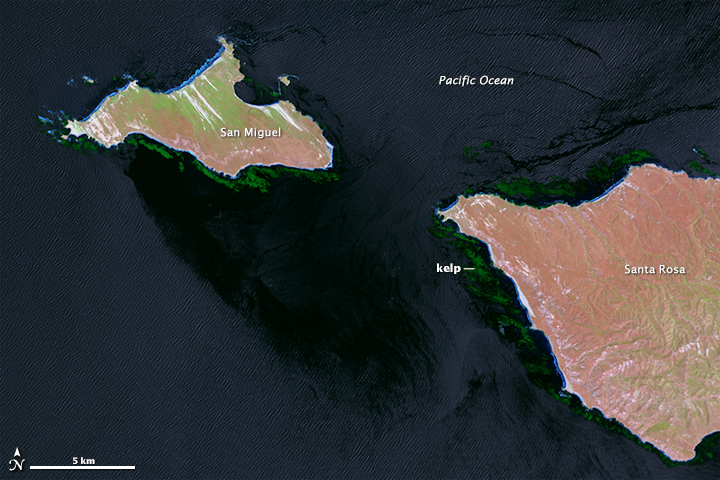
Channel Islands kelp forests off San Miguel Island and Santa Rosa Island. Kelp beds are difficult to spot in conventional color aerial photos but stand out clearly in this near-infrared image from Landsat data.

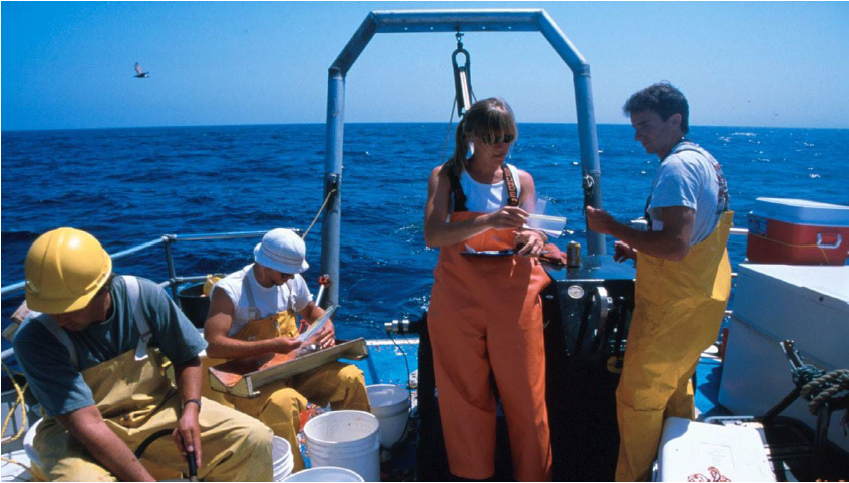
A research expedition in the sanctuary in 1989 which included trawl and sediment sampling.

The sanctuary has partnerships with the National Marine Fisheries Service, the National Park Service, and Fisheries and Oceans Canada, as well as regional and international academic institutions such as the University of California, Santa Barbara, the Scripps Institution of Oceanography, Woods Hole Oceanographic Institution, Simon Fraser University in Burnaby, British Columbia, Canada, and the University of Auckland in Auckland, New Zealand. These partnerships are facilitated by staff research expertise as well as operational support provided by the NOAA research vessels Shearwater and Shark Cat.

The sanctuary is currently engaging in the following research:

=== Marine Protected Area monitoring ===
Within the sanctuary, there is a network of 13 state and federal marine reserves and conservation areas that provide additional protections to the ecosystem. The marine reserves network was established to protect whole ecosystems and restore ecosystem health. One possible effect of marine reserves is that they may provide "spillover benefits" to areas outside the reserves. Sanctuary staff are currently conducting research on the effectiveness of marine reserves for community dynamics. In one project, performed in collaboration with the Channel Islands National Park and colleagues at Simon Fraser University, staff are evaluating the food web interactions expressed in the long-term Kelp Forest Monitoring data set that the Channel Islands National Park has been collecting since 1984. That project has revealed that trophic relationships within MPAs are more robust, while outside MPAs these relationships are less so and the food web shows lower resilience and stability. In other work, with colleagues at the University of Auckland, they are examining potential competition between predators protected within MPAs (large fish and lobsters) and fishers who are targeting the prey of those predators (sea urchins). In addition, the sanctuary's ongoing maintenance of a network of oceanographic sensors provides a data stream that can contribute to our understanding of larval transport and adult animal movement across MPA boundaries.

=== Climate variability ===
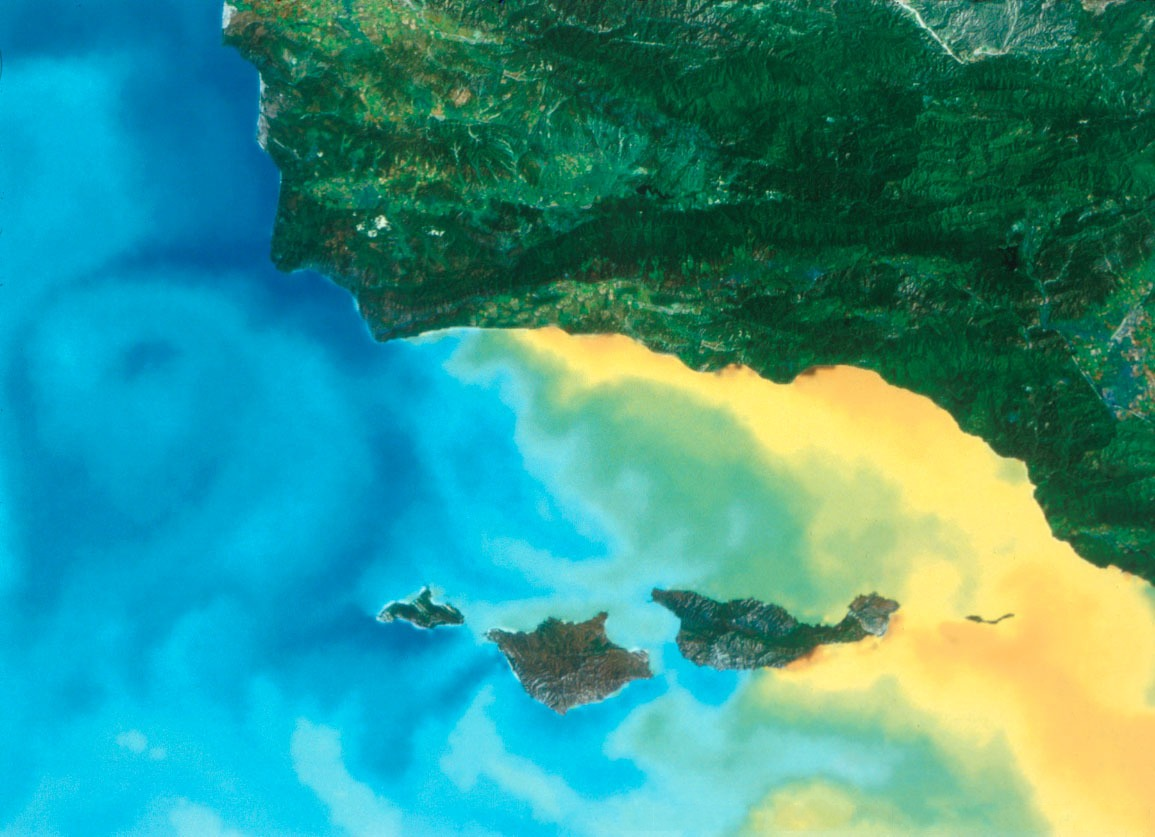
This satellite image shows the sea-water temperature variations around the Northern Channel Islands. Temperature ranges are blue = 44–52 °F (7–11 °C), green, yellow = 56–64 °F (13–18 °C), and orange, red = 65–72 °F (18–22 °C). From west to east, the islands are San Miguel, Santa Rosa, Santa Cruz, and Anacapa.

Sanctuary staff are currently looking at how short-term changes in climate can affect local conditions across large areas. Their work on the role of variability in jet stream trajectory and strength in determining seasonal variability in central Siberia allows a new and significantly more accurate ability to forecast the arrival of harsh winters several months in advance. This work has contributed to a better, more mechanistic understanding of the connectedness of climate processes across the Northern Hemisphere, from Siberia all the way to the US West Coast. More recently, they are looking at how these same processes manifest in long term data on winds along the Central and Southern California coast to see how climate variability signals can affect local winds in the Santa Barbara Channel area. Variation in wind strength has ecological effects by driving upwelling and also has a practical implication for local mariners: if climate change causes more windy days, there are fewer days for boating and fishing in the sanctuary. Additionally, the sanctuary's ongoing maintenance of a network of moorings provides a continuous data series of oceanographic conditions in nearshore waters that is informing climate variability studies.

=== Sanctuary Aerial Monitoring and Spatial Analysis Program ===
The Sanctuary Aerial Monitoring and Spatial Analysis Program (SAMSAP) is an ongoing long-term aerial monitoring program that collects data on vessel and visitor use patterns and cetacean populations within the sanctuary. SAMSAP has been active since 1997 and has been instrumental in providing vital data for management, research, and emergency response needs.

=== Whale research ===
A humpback whale dives beneath the surface beside a whale watching boat in the sanctuary.

After populations of large whales were decimated by whaling in the last two centuries, several species are rebounding. Channel Islands National Marine Sanctuary is a seasonal home to several species of those large whales. From early spring to late fall, the sanctuary sees increasing numbers of humpback, blue, and fin whales- with seasonally migrating gray whales transiting the sanctuary on their trips between the North Pacific and the lagoons of Baja California. At times, large whales aggregate in tremendous numbers, with as many as 186 unique photo identifications occurring in a single day. Understanding the causes of this aggregation, such as bloom dynamics of the krill the whales feed on, can provide valuable forecasting information to predict where whales are likely to be in the near term. This information in turn could aid in reducing whale-ship interactions. Ongoing work has focused on behavioral responses of large whales to close encounters with large vessels transiting the Santa Barbara Channel. This work is being extended to focus on two problems: how variability in krill depth is key to whale decision making, and how the whales are selecting specific sized prey within pools of mixed-age krill. To get after these questions, sanctuary staff and contractors are combining an ongoing program of tagging large whales with time-depth-location recording tags with systematic mapping of krill fields around the sanctuary. The sanctuary is assisting the work of partners from Cascadia Research Collective and Scripps Institution of Oceanography.

=== Shipping ===
The Port of Los Angeles and Long Beach is the largest commercial harbor on the west coast with over 6,500 vessels stopping each year. Much of that traffic passes the Santa Barbara Channel and the Channel Islands National Marine Sanctuary on its way to ports around the Pacific Rim. These vessels are large, with some being over 1,000 feet long, and fast; they can travel at speeds over 20 knots. They also emit significant exhaust into the area and are the principal source of underwater noise in the sanctuary. To keep track of how these ships may affect the sanctuary staff have been building on a long-term program to monitor broad band acoustics in and around the sanctuary. As a first step they are developing data management solutions with partners at the Scripps Institution of Oceanography and the National Center for Ecological Analysis and Synthesis for two new data streams: broadband acoustic data and Automatic Identification System (AIS) data on ship travel. Although both sources of data were originally developed for other objectives—oceanographic research and safety at sea—these data streams provide valuable information for evaluation of spatial use patterns. For example, recent work evaluating California State air quality rulings on vessel fuel use demonstrated a major change in traffic patterns and emerging conflicts in use of the ocean by shipping and National Defense interests. Evaluating these data in the context of shifts of vessel traffic has also revealed quantitative relationships between economic indicators (numbers of ships and amount of cargo) and noise levels in the sanctuary.

=== Deep water communities ===
The sanctuary contains a significant amount of deep-water habitat: about 91.5% of the sanctuary is deeper than 100 ft. From depths of 100 ft to over 5,000 ft, deep water habitat experiences cold water, almost no light, and low oxygen, yet a variety of specially adapted animals such as corals, sponges, crabs, shrimp, fish, anemones, cucumbers, sea stars, and worms reside here. In 2010, a NOAA expedition surveyed an underwater feature in the Footprint Marine Reserve to learn more about the abundance and distribution of coral and sponge habitat and to study the chemistry of the water in which these animals live.

== Recreational activities ==
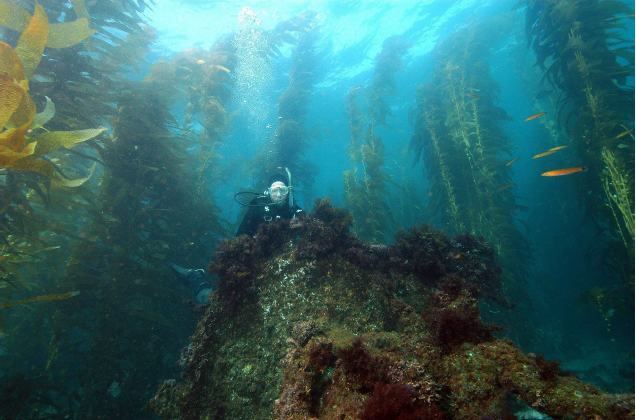
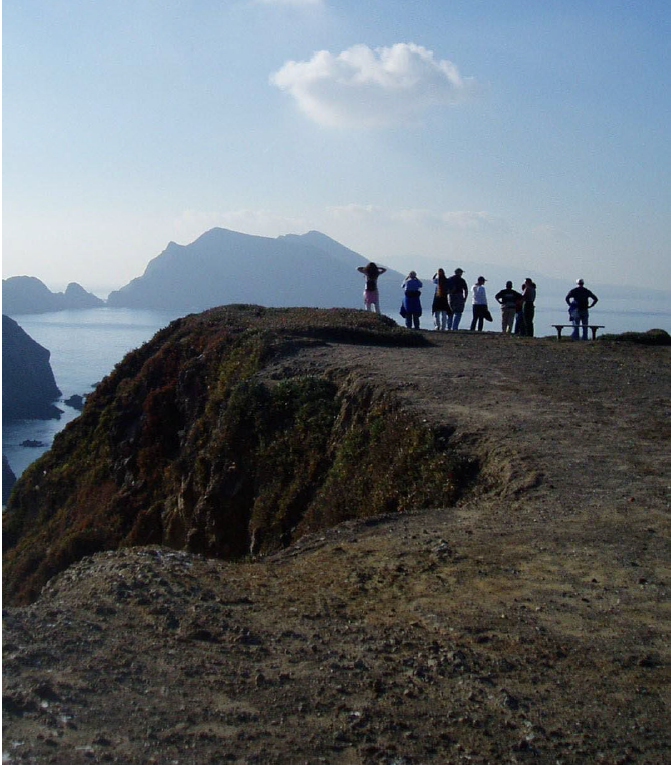
LEFT: A diver in the sanctuary investigates the wreck of SS Winfield Scott. RIGHT: Hikers in the sanctuary..

The sanctuary is also a site for recreational activities, such as scuba diving, snorkeling, kayaking, boating, viewing wildlife, and fishing.

In an effort to balance recreation and conservation, the California Fish and Game Commission established a network of Marine Protected Areas (MPAs) within the nearshore waters of the sanctuary in 2002. The NOAA expanded the MPA network into the sanctuary's deeper waters in 2006 and 2007. The entire MPA network consists of 11 marine reserves: Richardson Rock, Judith Rock, Harris Point, South Point, Carrington Point, Skunk Point, Gull Island, Painted Cave, Scorpion, Footprint, and Anacapa Island. All take and harvest from these marine reserves is prohibited. There are two marine conservation areas that allow limited take of lobster and pelagic fish. This MPA network encompasses 241 square miles (241 sq mi; 624 km^{2}).

More than 150 historic ships and aircraft have been reported lost within the waters of the sanctuary, although just 25 have been discovered to date.

== Maritime Heritage ==
Channel Islands National Marine Sanctuary is responsible for the protection and preservation of submerged remains of the past that occupy the bottomlands of the sanctuary. Cultural and historic submerged sites include archaeological remains of shipwrecks and prehistoric land sites. Sanctuary stewardship responsibilities include a mandate to inventory sites, encourage research, provide public education and oversee responsible visitor use.

== Chumash ==
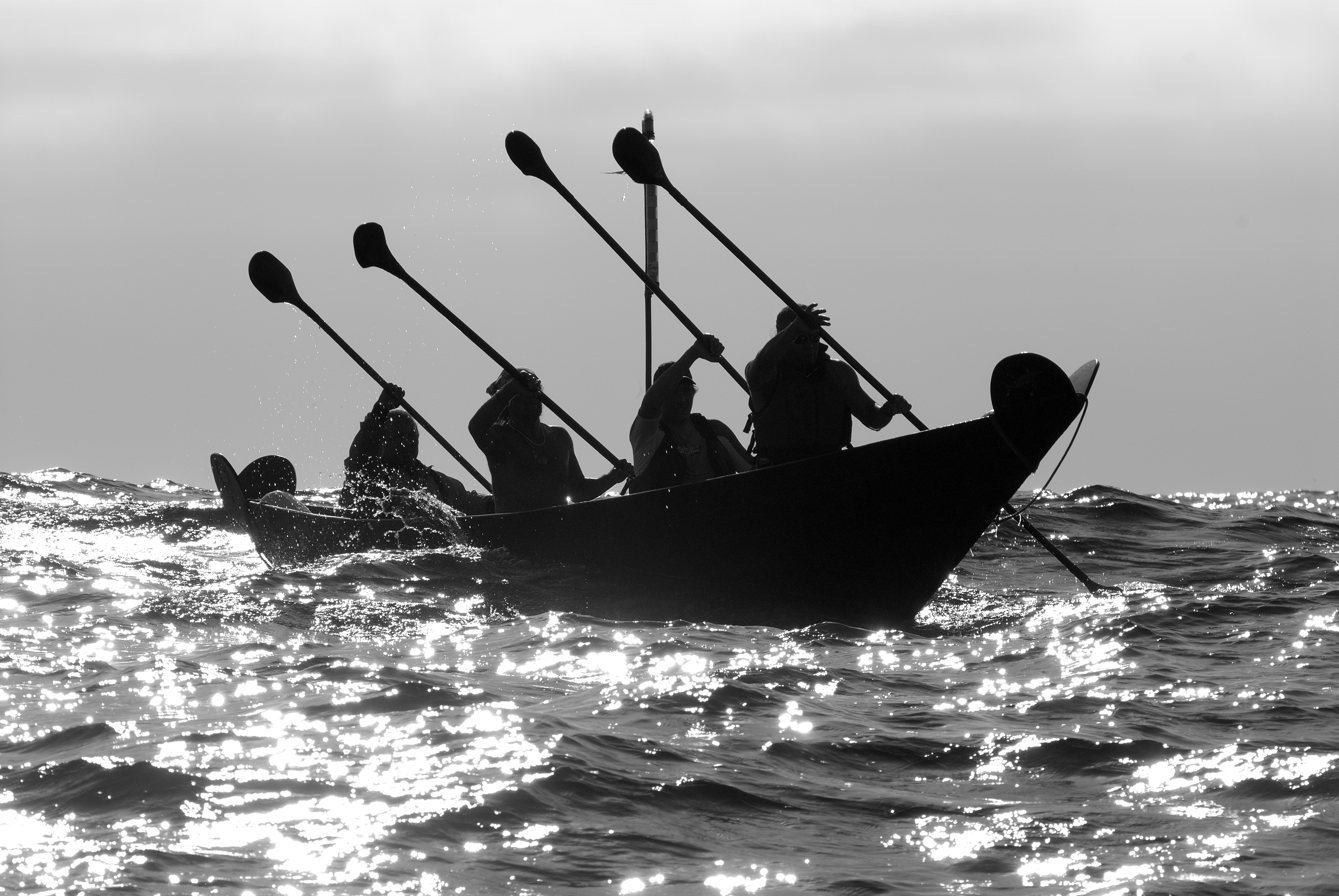
Chumash Tomol 'Elye'wun paddlers near Santa Cruz Island, CINMS 2006

The Northern Channel Islands have been home to the Chumash people for millennia, with the earliest known human remains dating back more than 13,000 years ago. The Chumash community continues to celebrate their maritime heritage through local cultural events such as an annual crossing of the Santa Barbara Channel on traditional plank canoes known as tomols.

== Protected species ==
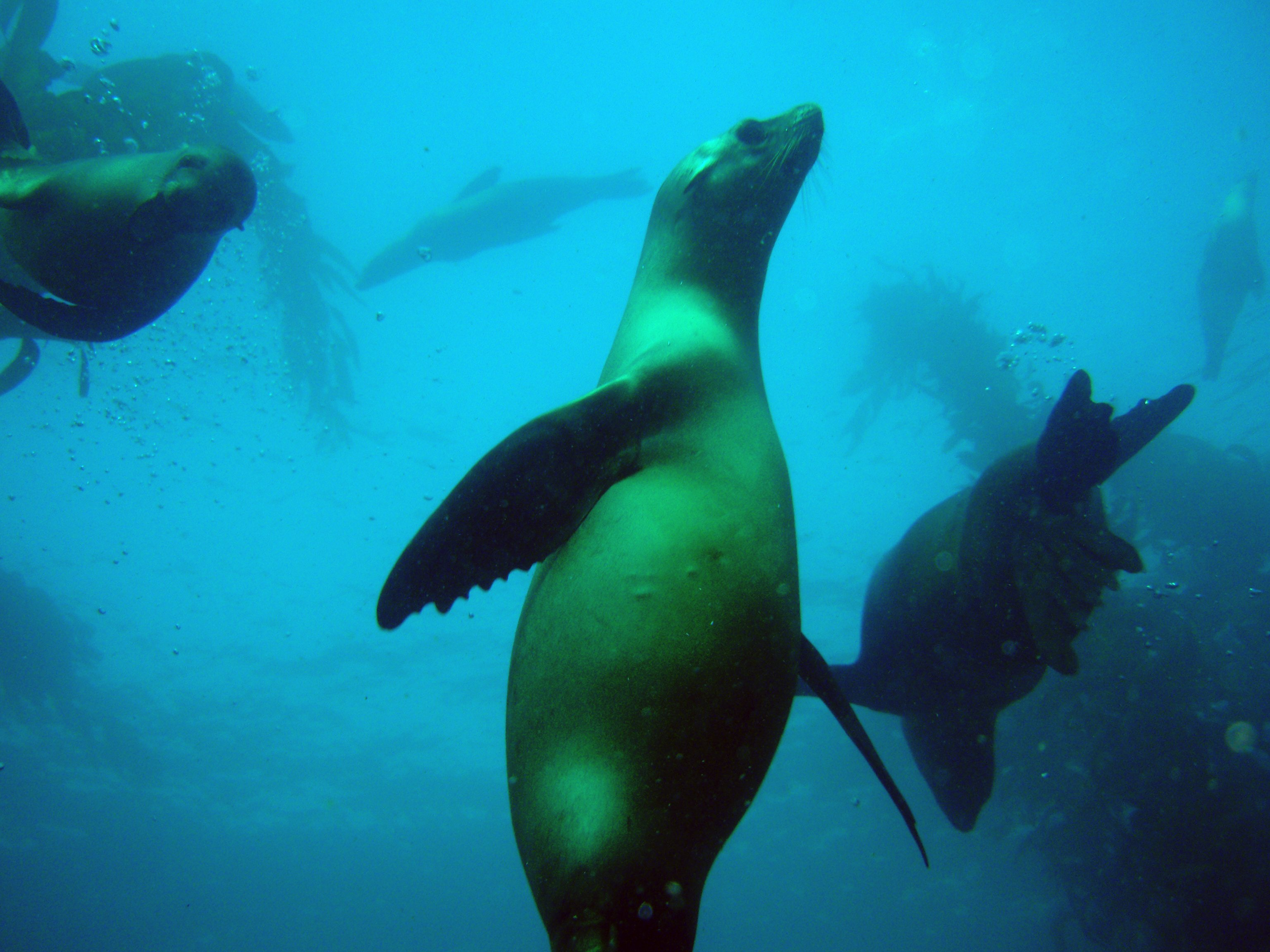
California sea lions in the kelp forest off San Miguel Island, CINMS. Over 80,000 California sea lions live and breed in the Channel Islands. These and other marine mammals are protected by the Marine Mammal Protection Act of 1972.

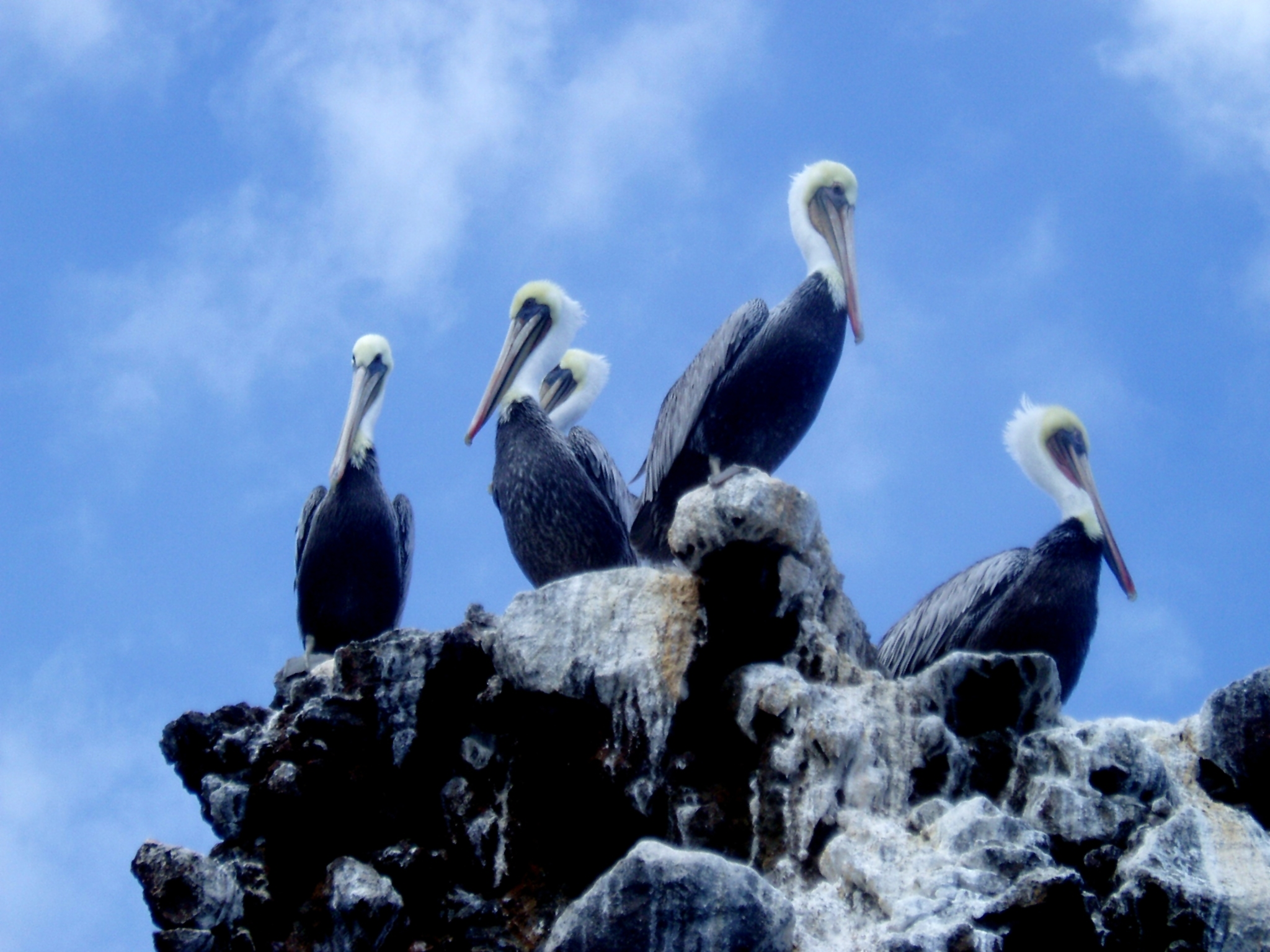
Brown pelicans, Pelecanus occidentalis, CINMS

The species listed below, found within the Channel Islands National Marine Sanctuary, are recognized as endangered, threatened, or species of concern under the Endangered Species Act and/or the California Endangered Species Act.

=== Endangered species found within the sanctuary ===
The species listed below are categorized by Federal and California state government as endangered:

- White abalone
- Tidewater goby
- Blue whale
- Humpback whale
- Fin whale
- Sei whale
- Sperm whale
- California least tern
- Black abalone
- Leatherback sea turtle
- Green sea turtle

=== Threatened species found within the sanctuary ===
The species listed below are categorized by Federal and California state government as threatened:

- Scripps's murrelet
- Guadalupe murrelet
- Southern sea otter
- Canary rockfish
- Snowy plover
- Island Fox

=== Species of concern found within the sanctuary ===
The species listed below are categorized by Federal and California state government as species of concern

- Copper rockfish
- Brown rockfish
- Pink abalone
- Bocaccio rockfish
- Ashy storm petrel

=== Delisted species found within the sanctuary ===
The species listed below are categorized by Federal and California state government as delisted

- Peregrine falcon
- Gray whale
- Brown pelican
- Bald eagle
- Steller sea lion

== Sanctuary Advisory Council ==
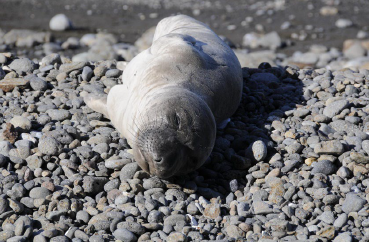
A northern elephant seal sleeps on the sanctuary's shore.

The Sanctuary Advisory Council was established in December 1998 to assure continued public participation in management of the sanctuary. It provides a public forum for consultation and community deliberation on resource management issues affecting the waters surrounding the Channel Islands. It is composed of 21 members and 21 alternate seats that include local stakeholder groups and governmental agencies.

== Threats to the sanctuary ==
Protecting the resources of Channel Islands National Marine Sanctuary is a collaborative effort involving local, state and federal agencies as well as numerous non-governmental organizations. The sanctuary focuses on education, permitting, regulations, emergency response preparedness, enforcement, and consultation with other agencies to help protect the sanctuary's resources.

Current threats in the sanctuary include ship strikes on endangered whales, ocean acidification, invasive species, damage to eelgrass beds, marine debris, poaching, and water pollution.

== See also ==
- Channel Islands National Marine Sanctuary at Commons
- List of marine protected areas of California
