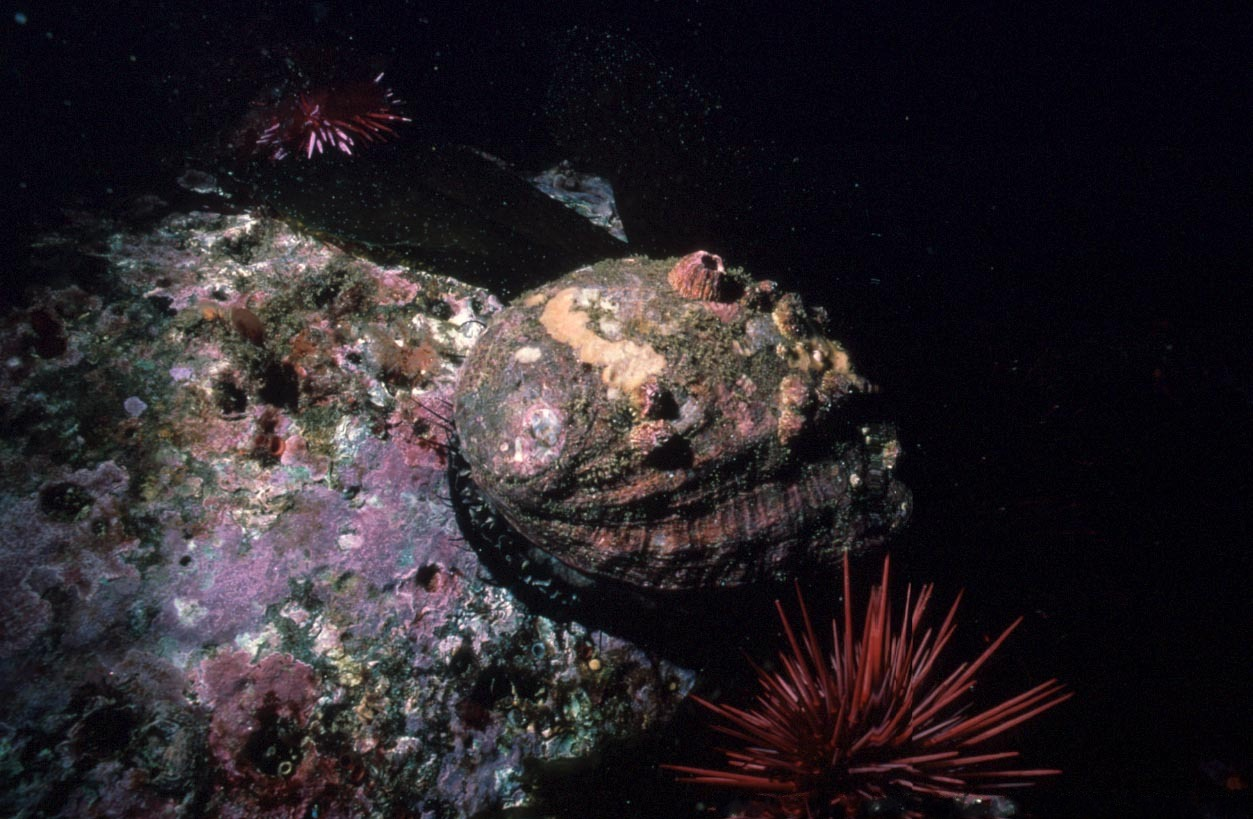
- The Pink abalone, Haliotis corrugata, in situ

Conservation status
- Critically Endangered (IUCN 3.1)

- Vulnerable (NatureServe)

Scientific classification
- Kingdom: Animalia
- Phylum: Mollusca
- Class: Gastropoda
- Subclass: Vetigastropoda
- Order: Lepetellida
- Family: Haliotidae
- Genus: Haliotis
- Species: H. corrugata

Binomial name
- Haliotis corrugata W. Wood, 1828

Synonyms
- Haliotis diegoensis Orcutt, 1900; Haliotis nodosa Philippi, 1845

= Haliotis corrugata =

Species of gastropod

The pink abalone, scientific name Haliotis corrugata, is a species of large edible sea snail, a marine gastropod mollusk in the family Haliotidae, the abalone.

== Subspecies ==
- H. c. corrugata W. Wood, 1828 (synonyms: Haliotis diegoensis Orcutt, 1900; Haliotis nodosa Philippi, 1845)
- H. c. oweni Talmadge, 1966 - synonym: Haliotis oweni Talmadge, 1966

== Distribution ==
Pink abalone can be found along the Pacific coast of North America from Point Conception, California to Bahia de Santa Maria, Baja California Sur, Mexico.

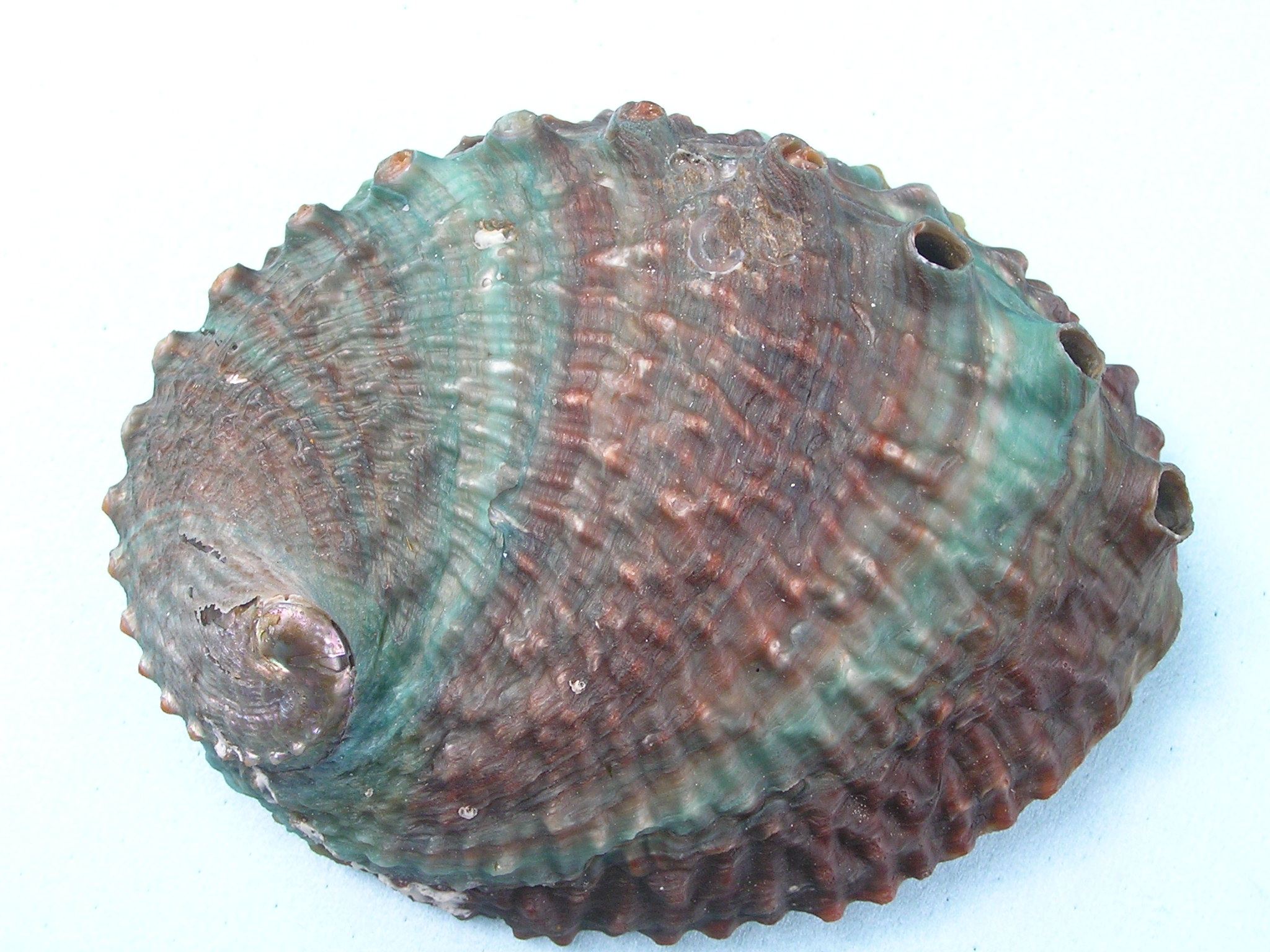
Dorsal view of a shell of Haliotis corrugata

== Description ==
The shell is thick and characterized by strong corrugations and is more circular than other American abalone. The two to four open respiratory apertures have edges that are strongly elevated above the surface of the shell. These holes collectively make up the selenizone, which forms as the shell grows. The epipodium is a "ruffle" of tissue along the side of the foot. The head and epipodial tentacles are black, but the epipodial fringes are a mottled black and white, with many tubercles on the surface and a lacy edge.

"The large shell is subcircular or short, oval, very convex, like a halfglobe. The surface is corrugated all over with nodose wrinkles. The three open perforations are elevated and tubular. The inner surface is dark, very brilliantly iridescent. The roughened muscle scar is distinct. The outline is more rounded than usual, being a very short oval. The back is very convex. The strong epidermis is dull, olive-brown with usually wide oblique greenish intervals. The sculpture begins as crowded spiral cords or lirae, but over the greater part of the body whorl these become nodose at short intervals, or are crossed by obliquely radiating corrugations. It is angled at the row of the holes. Below these there is a distinct spiral channel or furrow, bounded below by a more or less distinct row of nodules. And between this and the columellar margin it is obliquely corrugated. The folds scalloping the lower part of the columellar margin. The spire does not project above the general outline of the shell. The inner surface is dark, iridescent, with red predominating in the coloration. The muscle impression is large, distinct, roughened all over, and like fine mosaic work in its brilliant coloration. The flat or concave columellar plate slopes strongly inward, and is not at all truncate at the base. Above it, it almost conceals the small cavity of the spire. The large tubular perforations number sometimes two, but normally three."

== Ecology ==
=== Habitat ===
This species occupies sheltered waters at depths between 20 and 118 feet (6 – 36 m). They are herbivores, feeding on kelp and drifting algae.

=== Life cycle ===
Pink abalone have separate sexes and broadcast spawn from March to November. Maturity is reached at about 1.4 in (35 mm) length or three to four years. Lifespan is 70 years or more.

=== Predators ===
Predators of this species other than mankind are sea otters, sea stars, large fish, and octopus.

=== Diseases ===
Pink abalone are subject to a chronic, progressive and lethal disease: the Withering Syndrome or abalone wasting disease, leading to mass mortality.

== Threats and conservation ==
Pink abalone are threatened by historic overharvesting, illegal harvest, withering abalone syndrome disease, and climate change. In 1996, the California Department of Fish and Game closed the commercial and recreational abalone fisheries in California, but populations continued to decline. California has a Abalone Recovery Management Plan to guide conservation efforts.

The pink abalone is a US National Marine Fisheries Service Species of Concern. Species of Concern are those species about which the National Oceanic and Atmospheric Administration, National Marine Fisheries Service has some concerns regarding status and threats, but for which insufficient information is available to indicate a need to list the species under the US Endangered Species Act.

Information regarding the status of pink abalone in Mexico is scant. A commercial fishery for pink abalone is still in place in Mexico and is managed by local cooperatives.
