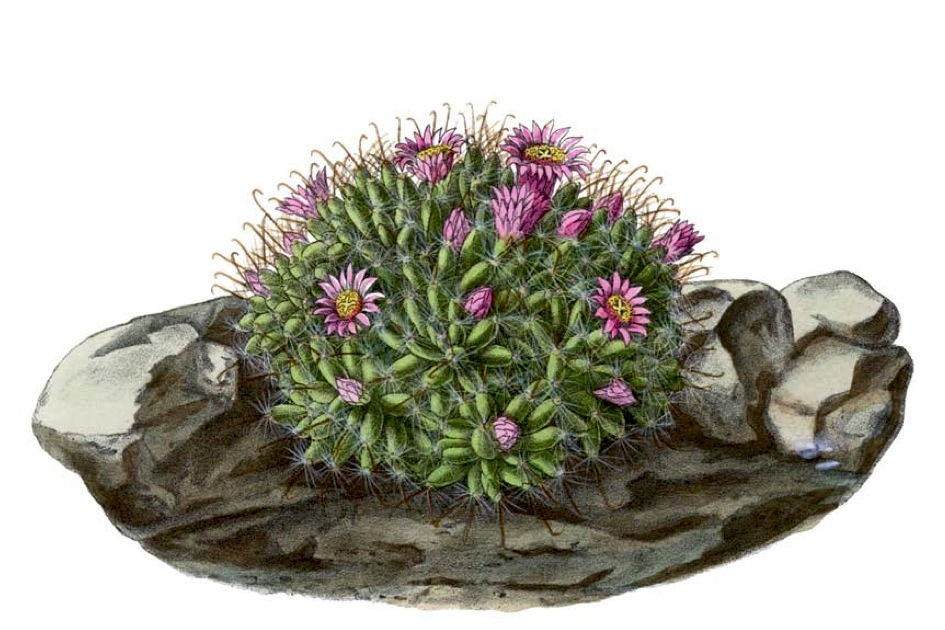

Scientific classification
- Kingdom: Plantae
- Clade: Tracheophytes
- Clade: Angiosperms
- Clade: Eudicots
- Order: Caryophyllales
- Family: Cactaceae
- Subfamily: Cactoideae
- Genus: Mammillaria
- Species: M. crinita

Binomial name
- Mammillaria crinita DC, 1828

= Mammillaria crinita =

Species of cactus

Mammillaria crinita is a species of cactus in the subfamily Cactoideae.
