= Point Conception =

Coastal headland in Santa Barbara County, California

Coordinates: 34°26′53″N 120°28′17″W

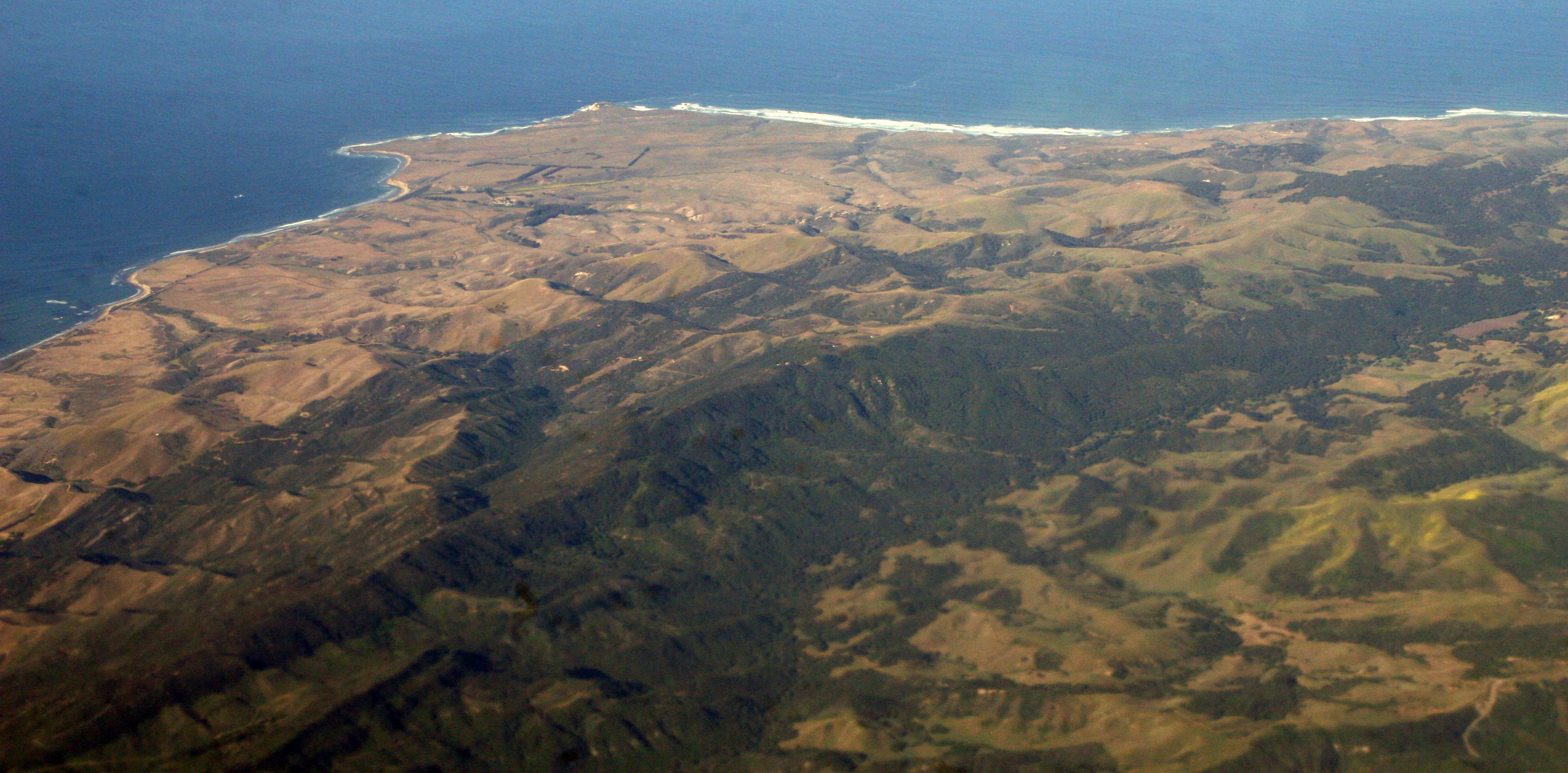
Point Conception and the Gaviota Coast from the air, looking southwest. The lighthouse at Point Conception is visible in blowup (click) at top left center. To the right (west) is Government Point, which partly encloses Cojo Bay. The Santa Ynez Mountains extend east (left) towards Santa Barbara.

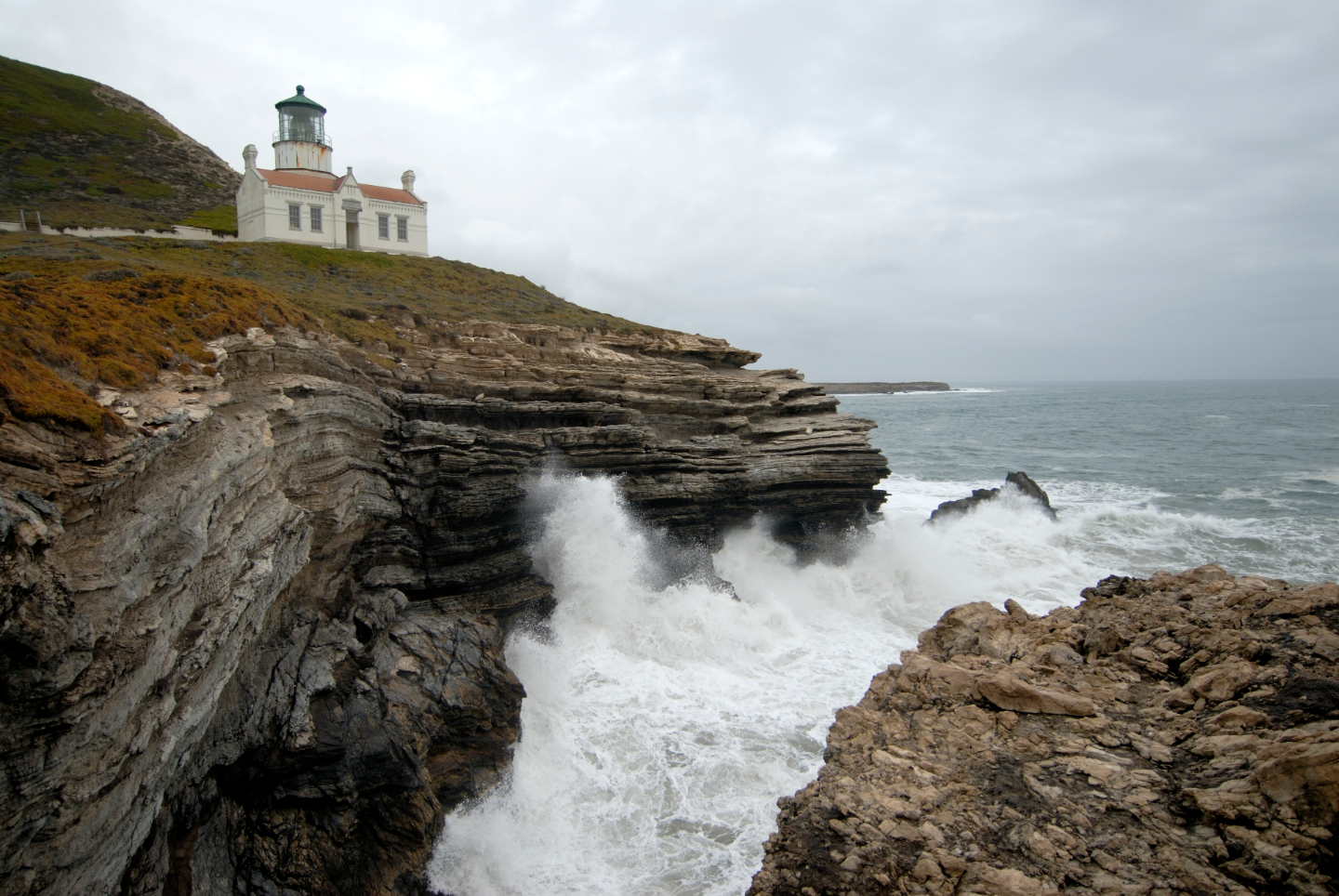
Point Conception Lighthouse stands on a bluff 133 feet (41 m) above the Pacific Ocean.

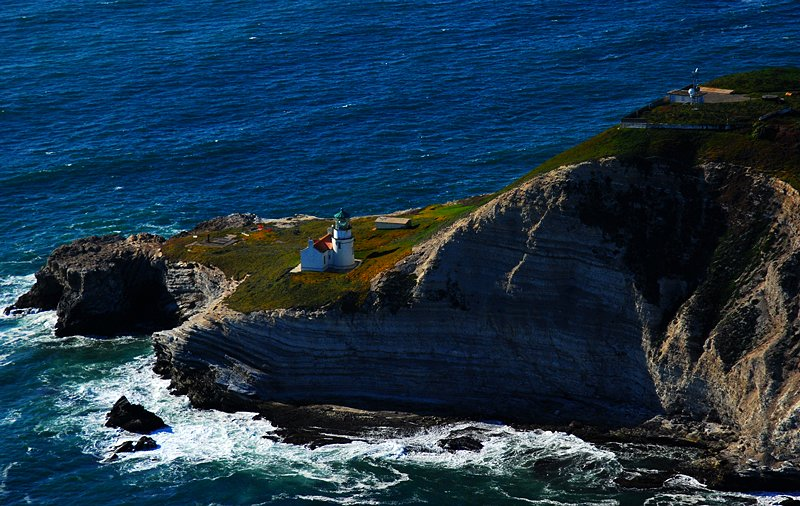
Aerial photo of the lighthouse, looking toward the northwest.

Point Conception (Chumash: Humqaq; Spanish: Punta Concepción) is a headland along the Gaviota Coast in southwestern Santa Barbara County, California, United States. It is the point where the Santa Barbara Channel meets the Pacific Ocean, and as the corner between the mostly north-south trending portion of coast to the north and the east-west trending part of the coast near Santa Barbara, it makes a natural division between Southern and Central California, and is commonly used as such in regional weather forecasts. Point Conception Light is at its tip and the Jack and Laura Dangermond Preserve covers some of the surrounding land.

== Name ==
Point Conception was named Cabo de Galera ("Galley Cape") by Spanish maritime explorer Juan Rodriguez Cabrillo in 1542. In 1602, Sebastian Vizcaíno sailed past again, renaming the protruding headland Punta de la Limpia Concepción ("Point of the Immaculate Conception"). Vizcaíno's name stuck, and was later anglicized to today's version.

== Chumash beliefs ==
The Chumash people of the region have traditionally known Point Conception as the "Western Gate", through which the souls of the dead could pass between the mortal world and the heavenly paradise of Similaqsa.

It is called Humqaq ("The Raven Comes") in the Chumashan languages.

In 1978, the Point Conception area was occupied "by Chumash and other Native Americans trying to save it from development by a liquefied natural gas company."
