= Withering abalone syndrome =

Sea snail disease

Withering abalone syndrome is a disease of the abalone shellfish, primarily found in Haliotis cracherodii. It has been recorded from the coasts of California and Baja California.

The disease is caused by the bacterium "Candidatus Xenohaliotis californiensis", which attacks the digestive tract and glands. It causes general lethargy and for the characteristic "foot" to atrophy. This impairs the abalone's ability to adhere to rocks, making it far more vulnerable to predation. The bacteria are believed to be transmitted along the fecal–oral route and through the water column.
