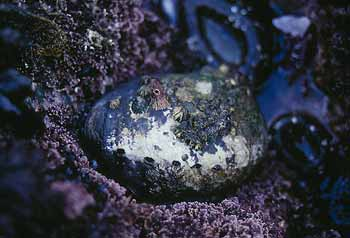
- Haliotis cracherodii in situ

Conservation status
- Critically Endangered (IUCN 3.1)

- Vulnerable (NatureServe)

Scientific classification
- Kingdom: Animalia
- Phylum: Mollusca
- Class: Gastropoda
- Subclass: Vetigastropoda
- Order: Lepetellida
- Family: Haliotidae
- Genus: Haliotis
- Species: H. cracherodii

Binomial name
- Haliotis cracherodii Leach, 1814

Synonyms
- Haliotis bonita Orcutt, 1900; Haliotis californiensis Swainson, 1822; Haliotis expansa Talmadge, 1954; Haliotis glabra Schubert & Wagner, 1829; Haliotis holzneri Hemphil, 1907; Haliotis imperforata Dall, 1919; Haliotis lusus Finlay, 1927; Haliotis splendidula Williamson, 1893

= Haliotis cracherodii =

Species of gastropod

Haliotis cracherodii, the black abalone, is a species of large edible sea snail, a marine gastropod mollusk in the family Haliotidae, the abalone.

This species is relatively small compared with most of the other abalone species from the eastern Pacific, and it has a relatively smooth dark shell.

This used to be the most abundant large marine mollusk on the west coast of North America, but now, because of overfishing and the withering syndrome, it has much declined in population and the IUCN Red List has classed the black abalone as Critically Endangered.

== Taxonomy ==
Haliotis cracherodii comprises two subspecies:

- Haliotis cracherodii californiensis Swainson, 1822 (synonyms: Haliotis bonita Orcutt, 1900; Haliotis californiensis Swainson, 1822)
- Haliotis cracherodii cracherodii Leach, 1814 (synonyms: Haliotis expansa Talmadge, 1957; Haliotis holzneri Hemphil, 1907; Haliotis imperforata Dall, 1919; Haliotis lusus Finlay, 1927; Haliotis rosea Orcutt, 1900; Haliotis splendidula Williamson, 1893)

== Description ==
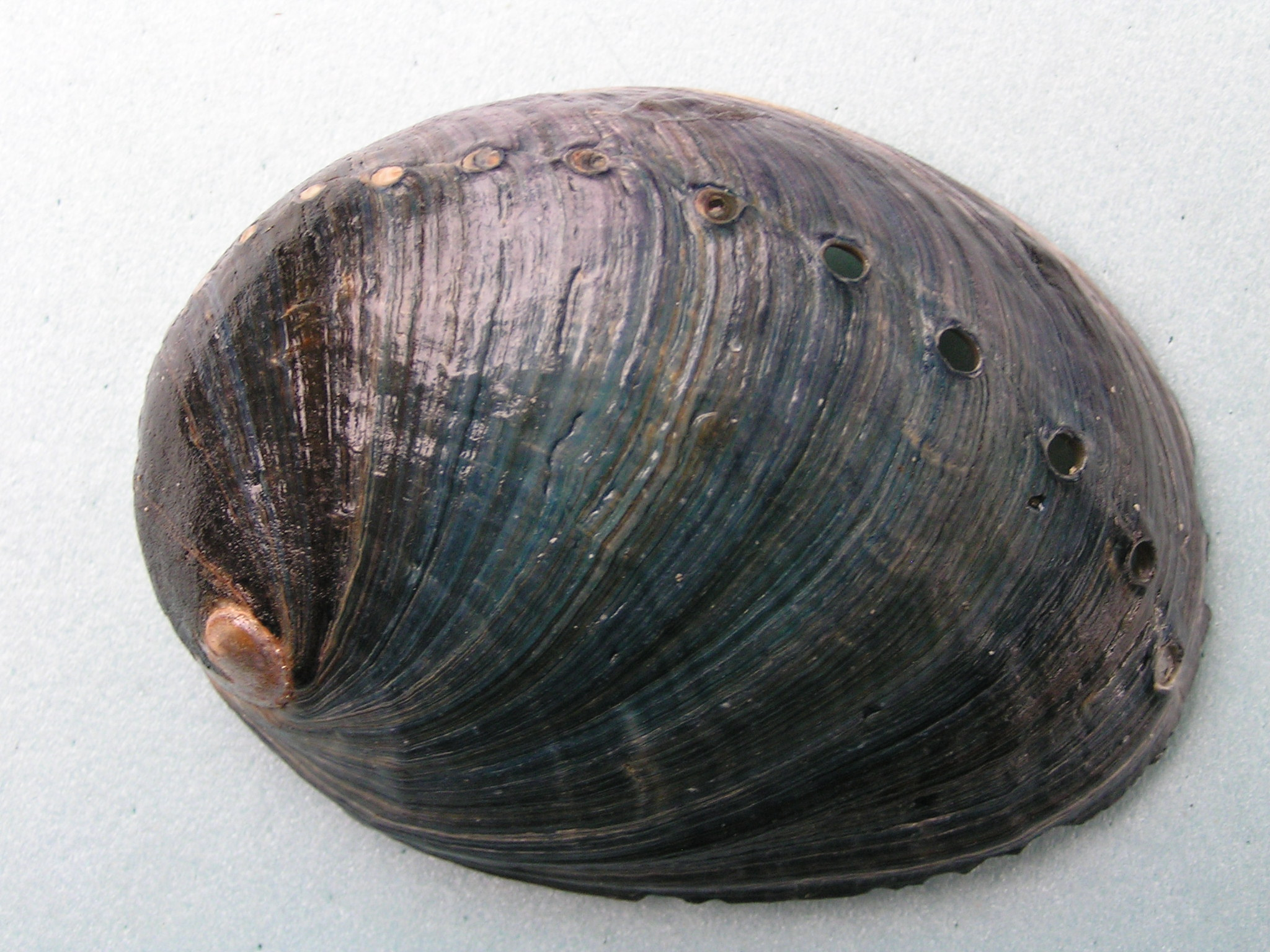
Dorsal view of a shell of Haliotis cracherodii

The coloration is dark brown, dark green, dark blue or almost black. The silvery interior of the shell shows a pale pinkish and greenish iridescence. The exterior of the shell is smoother than most abalone, or may have low obsolete coarse spiral lirae and lines of growth. The shell is oval, evenly convex, the two sides equally curved. The back of the shell is regularly convex, with little algal growth. The shell is not carinated at the row of holes. The spire is near the margin. The cavity of the spire is minute, concealed or nearly so. The muscle scar is generally not distinct. There are usually five to seven small, open respiratory holes, or pores, along the left side of the shell and the rims of the holes are flush with the rest of the shell. These holes collectively make up what is known as the selenizone which form as the shell grows. The columellar plate is not truncate below, sloping inward, its face concave. The rear of the shell is spiralled, and the mantle, foot and tentacles are black. The interior of the shell is pearly with pink and green iridescence.

The black abalone's shell length can reach a maximum of 20 cm (7.9 in), being typically 10–14 cm (3.9–5.5 in) long.

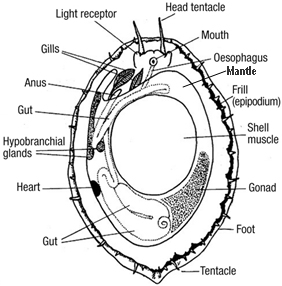
Anatomy of Haliotis cracherodii

In the living animal, the tentacles on the epipodium, the mantle, and the foot are black.

== Distribution ==
Black abalone can be found along the Pacific coast of the United States from Mendocino County, California to Cabo San Lucas, Baja California, Mexico.

Prehistoric distribution has been confirmed along much of this range from archaeological recovery at a variety of Pacific coastal Native American sites. For example, Chumash peoples in central California were known to have been harvesting black abalone approximately a millennium earlier in the Morro Bay area.

The subspecies Haliotis cracherodii californiensis is found around Guadalupe Island, off Baja California (Mexico).

== Ecology ==
=== Habitat ===
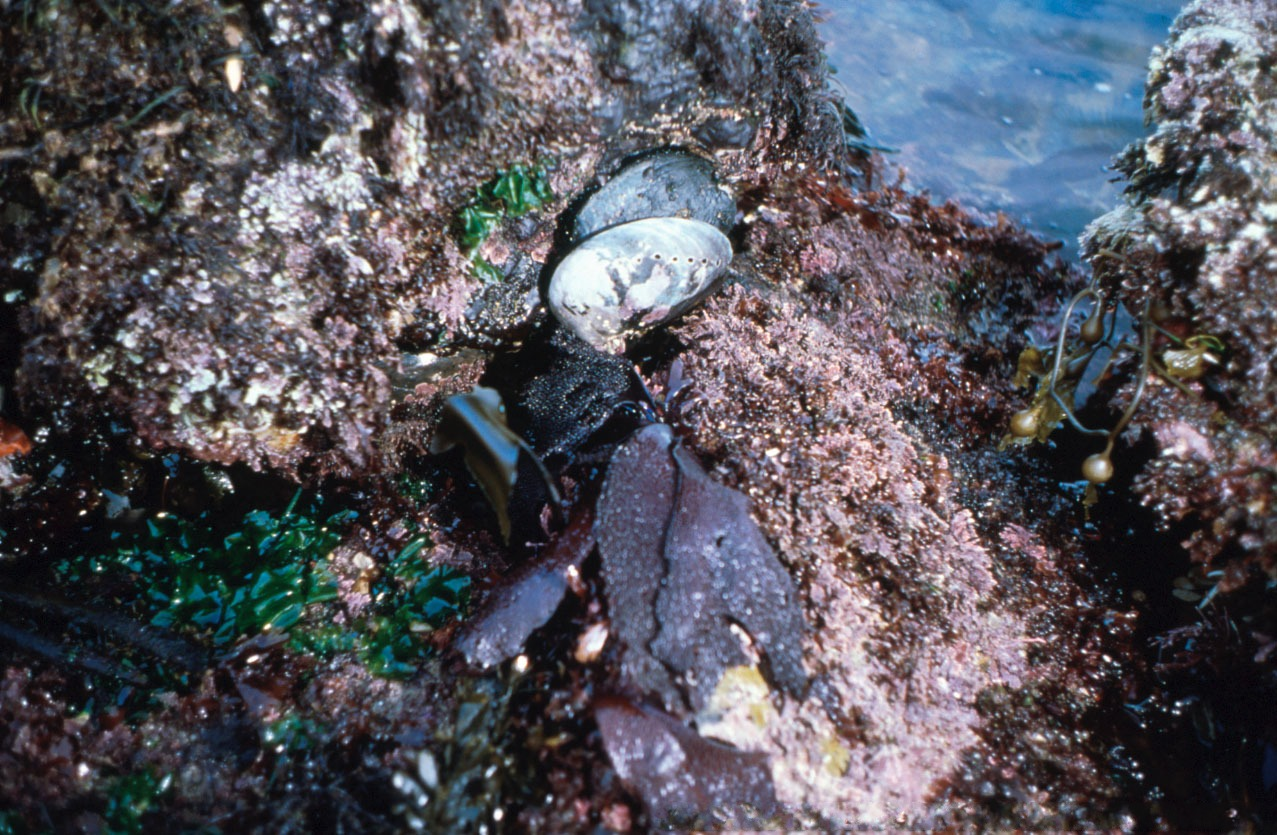
Two black abalone shells in a tide pool at low tide

Black abalone cling to rocky surfaces in the low intertidal zone, up to 6 m deep. They can typically be found wedged into crevices, cracks, and holes during low tide. They generally occur in areas of moderate to high surf. Juveniles tend to reside in crevices to reduce their risk of predation, but the larger adults will move out onto rock surfaces.

=== Life cycle ===
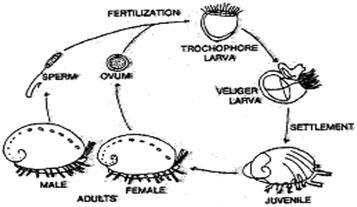
Life cycle of Haliotis cracherodii

Black abalone reach sexual maturity at 3 years and can live 30 years or more. Spawning occurs in spring and early summer; occasionally, a second spawn occurs in the fall. Black abalone are broadcast spawners, and successful spawning requires that individuals be grouped closely together. Larvae are free-swimming for between 5 and 14 days before they settle onto hard substrate, usually near larger individuals, where they then metamorphose into their adult form, develop a shell and settle onto a rock. Juveniles do not tend to disperse great distances, and current populations of black abalone are generally composed of individuals that were spawned locally. Juveniles settle in crevices and remain hidden until they reach approximately 4 inches in length. At that point, adults congregate in more exposed areas such as rocks and in tide pools. They are thought to be able to live for between 25 and 75 years, and will begin to reproduce between three and seven years.

=== Feeding habits ===
Black abalone are herbivorous gastropods, and feed mostly on drift algae and kelp. Their primary food species depend on the habitat. In southern California habitats, black abalone are thought to feed on the giant kelp (Macrocystis pyrifera) and feather boa kelp (Egregia menziesii), while in central and northern California habitats they feed on the bull kelp (Nereocystis leutkeana).

=== Interspecific relationships ===
Predators of this species other than mankind are sea otters (such as the southern sea otter, Enhydra lutris), fish (such as the California sheephead, Semicossyphus pulcher) and invertebrates, including crustaceans such as the striped shore crab, Pachygrapsus crassipes, and spiny lobsters. Competition for space with other species (such as the sea urchins Strongylocentrotus purpuratus and Strongylocentrotus franciscanus) is also frequent.

== Human uses ==
Humans have harvested black abalone along the California Coast for at least 10,000 years. On San Miguel Island, archaeological evidence shows that the Island Chumash people and their ancestors ate black abalone for millennia and also used the shells to make fishhooks, beads, and ornaments. After the Chumash and other California Indians were devastated by European diseases, and sea otters were nearly eradicated from California waters by the historic fur trade, black abalone populations rebounded and attracted an intensive intertidal fishery conducted primarily by Chinese immigrants from the 1850s to about 1900.

== Conservation status ==
Black abalone are listed on the International Union for Conservation of Nature's Red List as Critically Endangered (CR A4e). On June 23, 1999, the U.S. National Marine Fisheries Service (NMFS) designated the black abalone as a candidate for protection under the Endangered Species Act (64 FR 33466). On December 21, 2006, the Center for Biological Diversity submitted a petition to NMFS to list the black abalone. On January 11, 2008, NMFS completed their status review of the species and proposed that it be listed as endangered. Black abalone were listed as endangered on January 14, 2009. The NMFS designated critical habitat for the endangered black abalone on October 27, 2011. The state of California has introduced an Abalone Recovery Management Plan to guide conservation efforts.

Black abalone have dramatically declined in numbers throughout their historical range, and are locally extirpated in certain areas. This decline was initiated by overfishing. Following World War II, the California abalone fishery was not managed for individual species. Therefore, it resulted in a systematic depletion of various abalone species as the fishery over-harvested one species and then moved on to the next in an attempt to meet demand. Black abalone were the last to be targeted, with the peak harvest occurring in the 1970s. Additionally, improved harvesting technologies that expanded the harvesting areas and supported larger harvests per unit effort were not initiated. Now, all abalone fisheries in California are managed by the California Department of Fish and Game, which restricts the size of abalone caught, and the season in which harvesting can take place. In Mexico, there is a total allowable catch limit for black abalone. Even though harvesting black abalone is regulated in California, poaching still occurs. Other threats include coastal development for residential areas, harbours and waste discharges, compounded by commercial and recreational fishing of the black abalone.

The depleted stocks of black abalone were further reduced by withering syndrome, first discovered in 1985, when commercial fishermen reported large numbers of empty shells and dying abalone on the shores of several of the Californian Channel Islands (including the islands of Santa Cruz, Anacapa, Santa Rosa, Santa Barbara, San Miguel, and San Clemente). This disease impairs the production of digestive enzymes, effectively starving the abalone to death. Following onset of symptoms, the animal usually quickly dies. In many locations, percentages greater than 90% of individuals have been lost, and in some places, a total loss of the black abalone population occurred. The disease spread from the Channel Islands to the mainland coast in 1992, where it devastated most populations in warmer waters south of Point Conception or in locally warmer waters further north.
