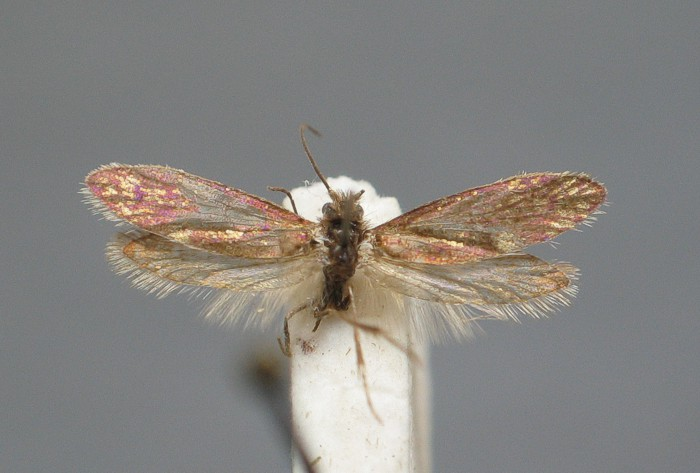

Scientific classification
- Kingdom: Animalia
- Phylum: Arthropoda
- Class: Insecta
- Order: Lepidoptera
- Family: Eriocraniidae
- Genus: Eriocrania
- Species: E. chrysolepidella

Binomial name
- Eriocrania chrysolepidella (Zeller, 1851)

Synonyms
- Micropteryx chrysolepidella Zeller, 1851; Paracrania chrysolepidella; Heringocrania chrysolepidella

= Eriocrania chrysolepidella =

Moth species in family Eriocraniidae

Eriocrania chrysolepidella (also known as the small hazel purple) is a moth of the family Eriocraniidae found in Europe. It was first described by the German entomologist, Philipp Christoph Zeller in 1851. The larvae mine the leaves of hazel and hornbeam.

== Description ==
The wingspan is about 9–13 mm. The head is black-brown with sparse, mixed brown and beige hair-like scales on the head The forewings are golden bronze with light gold and copper to purple scales, forming a reticulate pattern distad There is, basally of the tornus, an indistinct golden spot. The moth flies in April.

Similar species

Eriocrania cicatricella flies around birch trees (Betula species) in April and can be distinguished from E. chrysolepidella by the differences in genitalia.

Ovum

The egg is usually laid in the leaf-bud of hornbeam (Carpinus species) or hazel (Corylus species).

Larva

Larvae have a white body with a pale-brown head and may have a pair of brown spots on the pronotum. They mine the leaves, starting at the edge of a leaf, then form a large white blotch and there are often several larvae in a mine. The frass is described as either in long threads or can be granular and clumped together. Host species include; green alder (Alnus viridis), hornbeam (Carpinus betulus), hazel (Corylus avellana) and hop-hornbeam (Ostrya species).

Pupa

Larvae pupate in the soil in a tough, silken cocoon.

== Distribution ==
It is found in Europe, from Finland to the Pyrenees and Italy, and from Ireland to Romania.

== Etymology ==
In 1851, Philipp Christoph Zeller named the moth Micropteryx chrysolepidella from a specimen found in Vienna, Austria. The moth was later put in the genus Erioncrania. Erion refers to wool and kranion means the upper part of the head, which literally means woolly-headed, i.e. rough-haired, referring to the scales on the top of the head. The moth is also put in the genus Paracrania by some authorities. Para ″contrary to (as in a paradox)″ and kranion as above. The specific name refers to golden ground colour of the forewing – from the Greek khruson gold and lepis or lepidos ″a scale from the golden ground colour of the forewing″.
