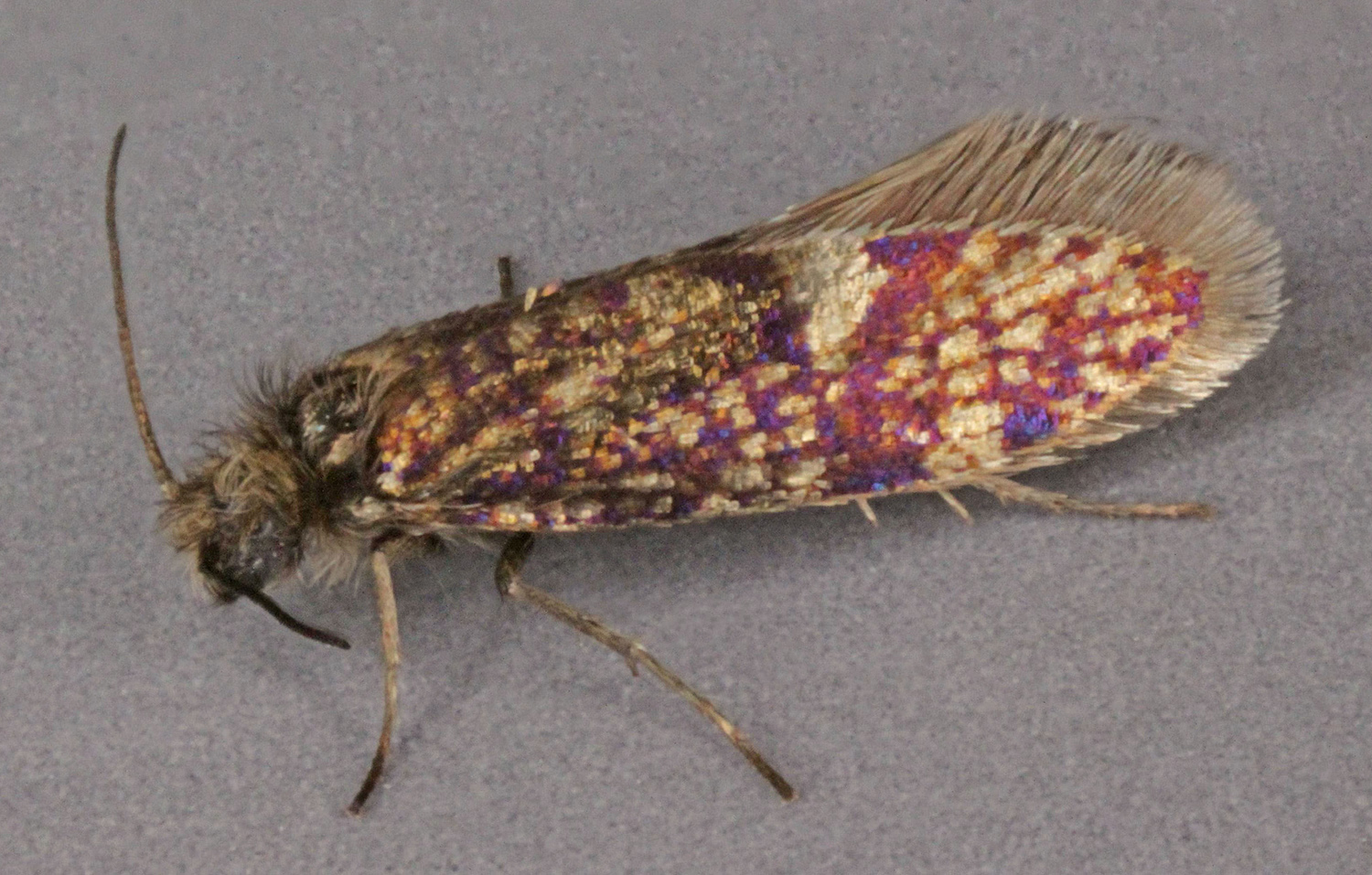
- Eriocrania salopiella, Trawscoed, North Wales

Scientific classification
- Kingdom: Animalia
- Phylum: Arthropoda
- Clade: Pancrustacea
- Class: Insecta
- Order: Lepidoptera
- Family: Eriocraniidae
- Genus: Eriocrania
- Species: E. salopiella

Binomial name
- Eriocrania salopiella (Stainton, 1854)

Synonyms
- Micropteryx salopiella Stainton, 1854

= Eriocrania salopiella =

Moth species in family Eriocraniidae

Eriocrania salopiella (also known as the small birch purple) is a moth of the family Eriocraniidae and is found in Europe. It was described by the English entomologist, Henry Tibbats Stainton in 1854. The larvae mine the leaves of birch (Betula species).

== Description ==
The wingspan is about 1 centimetre. The adult moths are golden coloured with purple markings with prominent yellow triangular patch on the tornus. The head is covered with golden hairs. Flies in the sunshine in April and May amongst birches. Meyrick describes it " Head ochreous-grey-whitish, somewhat mixed with dark fuscous. Antennae about 1/2. Forewings rather short and broad, pale shining golden, strigulated and sometimes partly suffused with purple, veins posteriorly purple; a well-marked subtriangular dorsal spot of ground- colour before tornus, reaching half across wing; an indistinct pale costal spot beyond this; cilia purplish-grey, on dorsal spot ochreous-wdiitish; 9 absent. Hindwings grey, posteriorly purplish-tinged. Larva whitish; head pale brown; anterior edge of 2 brownish : in blotch (elongate-ovate when young) in leaves of birch; 5.

Ovum

Eggs are laid on the leaves of birch including silver birch (Betula pendula) and downy birch (Betula pubescens)

Larva

The larvae are whitish with a pale brown head and mine the leaves of birch (Betula species) in May and June. The mine starts as a corridor, usually near the mid-rib and gradually widens to a blotch. Eriocrania sparrmannella has a similar looking mine, but feeds from mid-June to August.

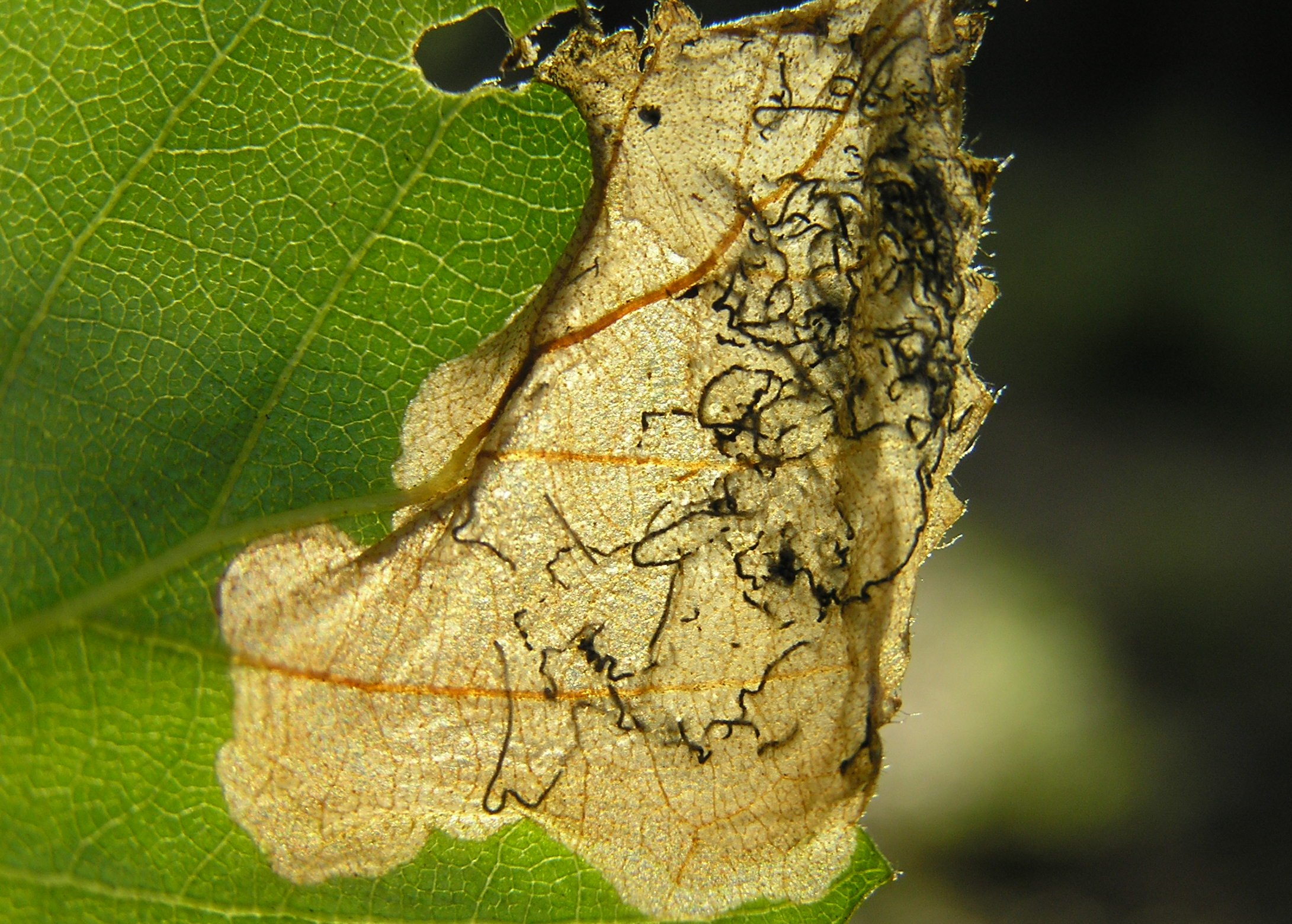
Mine

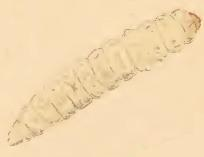
Larva

Pupa

The larvae pupate in the soil in a tough, silken cocoon.

== Distribution ==
The moth is found in northern and central Europe.

== Etymology ==
Stainton described the moth from a specimen found near Shrewsbury, Shropshire, England. He initially allocated the moth to the genus Micropteryx, which comes from the Greek for mikros, little and pterux, a wing. The moth was later moved to the genus Erioncrania. Erion refers to wool and kranion means the upper part of the head, which literally means woolly-headed, i.e. rough-haired, referring to the scales on the top of the head. The specific name, salopiella refers to Salop i.e. Shropshire, the locality of the type specimen.
