= Eriocrania carpinella =

Scientific classification
- Domain: Eukaryota
- Kingdom: Animalia
- Phylum: Arthropoda
- Class: Insecta
- Order: Lepidoptera
- Family: Eriocraniidae
- Genus: Eriocrania
- Species: E. carpinella

Binomial name
- Eriocrania carpinella Mizukawa, Hirowatari & Hashimoto, 2010

Moth species in family Eriocraniidae

Eriocrania carpinella is a moth of the family Eriocraniidae. It is found in Japan (Honshu).

The larvae feed on hornbeam's, including Carpinus laxiflora, Carpinus cordata and Carpinus tschonoskii.
