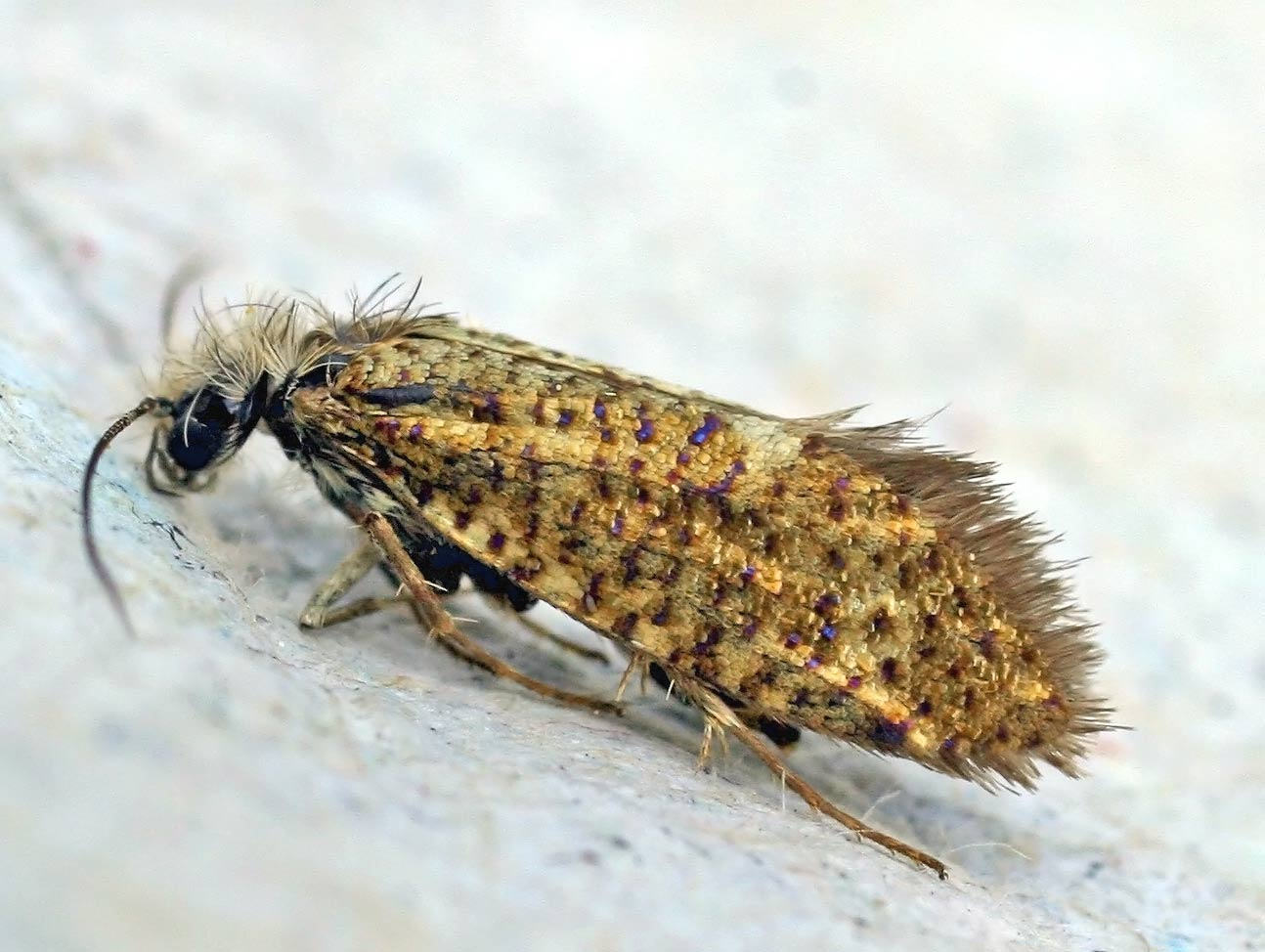

Scientific classification
- Kingdom: Animalia
- Phylum: Arthropoda
- Clade: Pancrustacea
- Class: Insecta
- Order: Lepidoptera
- Family: Eriocraniidae
- Genus: Eriocrania
- Species: E. semipurpurella

Binomial name
- Eriocrania semipurpurella (Stephens, 1835)

Synonyms
- Lampronia semipurpurella Stephens, 1835; Micropteryx amentella Zeller, 1850; Micropteryx inconspicuella Wood, 1890

= Eriocrania semipurpurella =

Moth species in family Eriocraniidae

Eriocrania semipurpurella (Purplish birch-miner) is a moth of the family Eriocraniidae, found from Europe to Japan and in North America. It was first described by James Francis Stephens in 1835. The species closely resembles Eriocrania sangii and the larvae of both species mine the leaves of birch.

== Description ==
The wingspan is 10–16 mm. Edward Meyrick gives this description: Forewings elongate, bronzy-purple, more or less sprinkled with pale shining golden; an indistinct usually small transverse pale golden dorsal spot before tornus, sometimes almost obsolete; cilia bronzy-grey, on dorsal spot ochreous-whitish; 9 absent. Hindwings with hairscales except towards margins posteriorly, bronzy-grey, posteriorly purplish-tinged. Larva whitish; head pale ochreous-brown, mouth darker in blotch in leaves of birch. The moth flies from March to April depending on the location.

The moth flies in sunshine around birch trees (Betula species), sometimes in swarms in March and April. In dull weather, they rest on twigs.

Similar species

E. semipurpurella looks similar to E. sangii and can only be told apart by microscopy of the genitalia.

Other stages

Eggs are laid on the leaf bud and the larvae feed on the leaves in a mine from the end of March to early-May. The mine starts at or near the edge of a leaf and widens into a blotch. The frass is string-like. The larvae have dark markings on the head and prothorax which lighten as it matures. Pupation takes place in a tough silken cocoon in the soil.

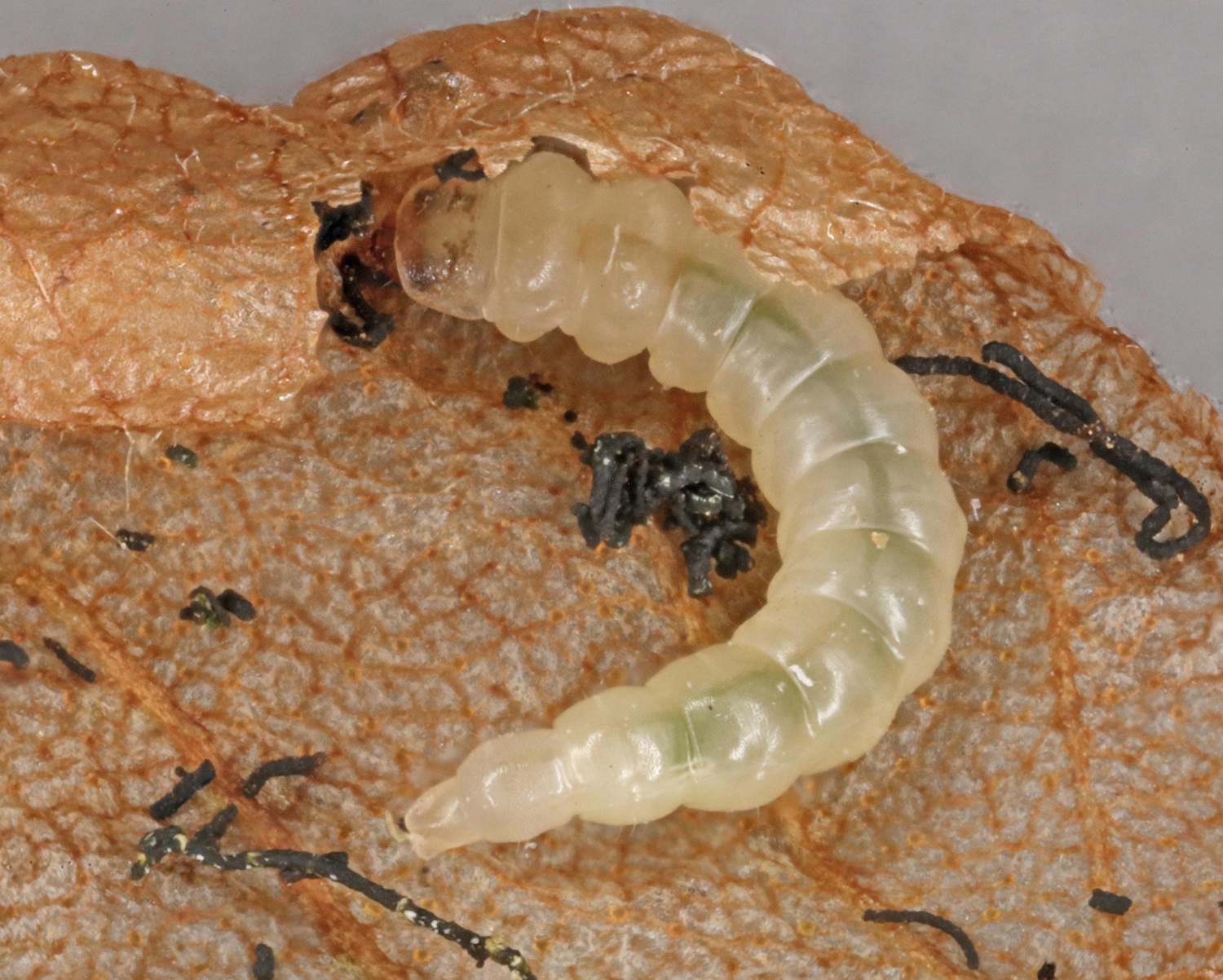
Larva

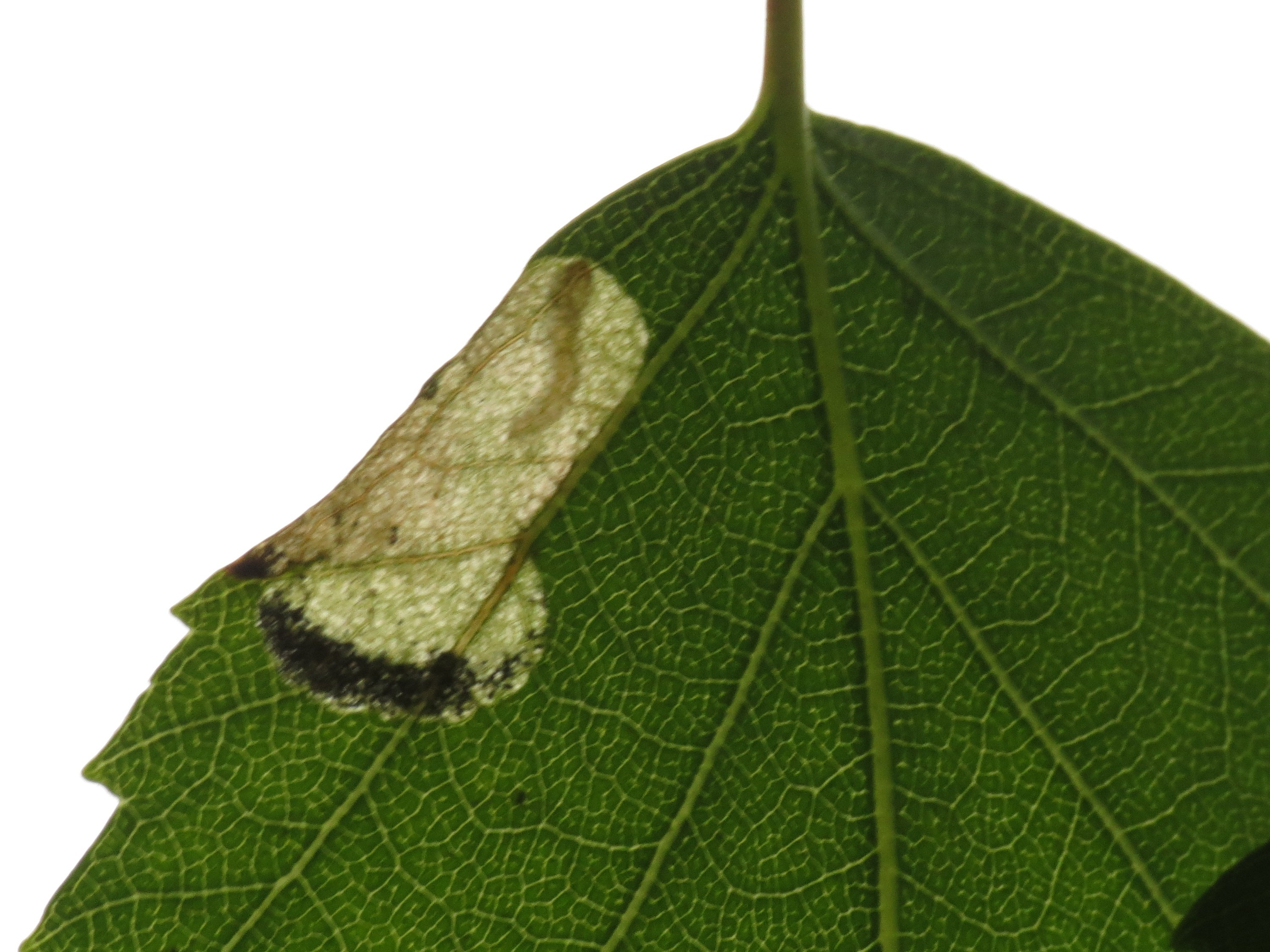
Mine

== Subspecies ==
- Eriocrania semipurpurella semipurpurella (North America (from eastern Ontario east to Nova Scotia and south to southern New York), from Great Britain through northern and central Europe to Japan)
- Eriocrania semipurpurella pacifica Clarke, 1978 (southern Alaska and north-western Washington)

== Etymology ==
Stephens described the moth from a specimen found in Darenth Wood, Kent, England, naming the moth, Lampronia semipurpurella. The genus Lampronia was raised by Stephens in 1829 and is from the Greek lampros – meaning ″bright: from the bright coloration of some of the species.″ The moth is now in the genus Eriocrania, which was raised by Philipp Christoph Zeller in 1851. Erion means wool and kranion means the upper part of the head, which refers to the hair-scales on the top of the head. The specific name semipurpurella is from semi – half, and purpureus – from the forewing colouration.
