= Eriocrania komaii =

Scientific classification
- Domain: Eukaryota
- Kingdom: Animalia
- Phylum: Arthropoda
- Class: Insecta
- Order: Lepidoptera
- Family: Eriocraniidae
- Genus: Eriocrania
- Species: E. komaii

Binomial name
- Eriocrania komaii Mizukawa, Hirowatari & Hashimoto, 2006

Moth species in family Eriocraniidae

Eriocrania komaii is a moth of the family Eriocraniidae. It is endemic to Japan (Honshu).

The larvae probably feed on the leaves of Sorbus japonlca.
