= Eriocrania sakhalinella =

Scientific classification
- Kingdom: Animalia
- Phylum: Arthropoda
- Clade: Pancrustacea
- Class: Insecta
- Order: Lepidoptera
- Family: Eriocraniidae
- Genus: Eriocrania
- Species: E. sakhalinella

Binomial name
- Eriocrania sakhalinella Kozlov, 1983

Moth species in family Eriocraniidae

Eriocrania sakhalinella is a moth of the family Eriocraniidae. It was described, in 1983 by Mikhail Vasilievich Kozlov, from a specimen found on Sakhalin Island, Russia. It is also found in Japan.

The larvae feed on Alnus hirusuta.
