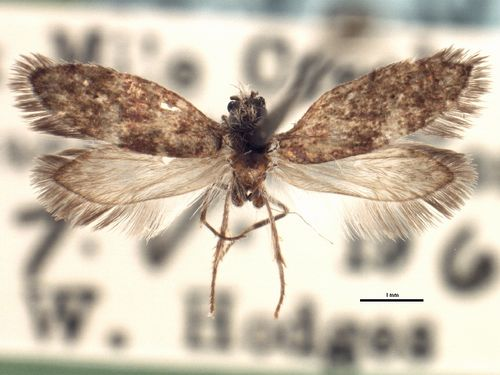

Scientific classification
- Kingdom: Animalia
- Phylum: Arthropoda
- Clade: Pancrustacea
- Class: Insecta
- Order: Lepidoptera
- Family: Eriocraniidae
- Genus: Eriocrania
- Species: E. breviapex

Binomial name
- Eriocrania breviapex Davis, 1978

= Eriocrania breviapex =

Moth species in family Eriocraniidae

Eriocrania breviapex is a moth of the family Eriocraniidae. It is found in the Cayuga Lake Basin of north-western New York.

The wingspan is 7.5–9 mm. The forewings are light fuscous with a slight bronze to purplish iridescence, irregularly marked with small pale golden to brassy spots. The hindwings are paler than the forewings and sparsely scaled with long, slender, hairlike brownish-fuscous scales. Adults are on wing from early to mid May in one generation per year.
