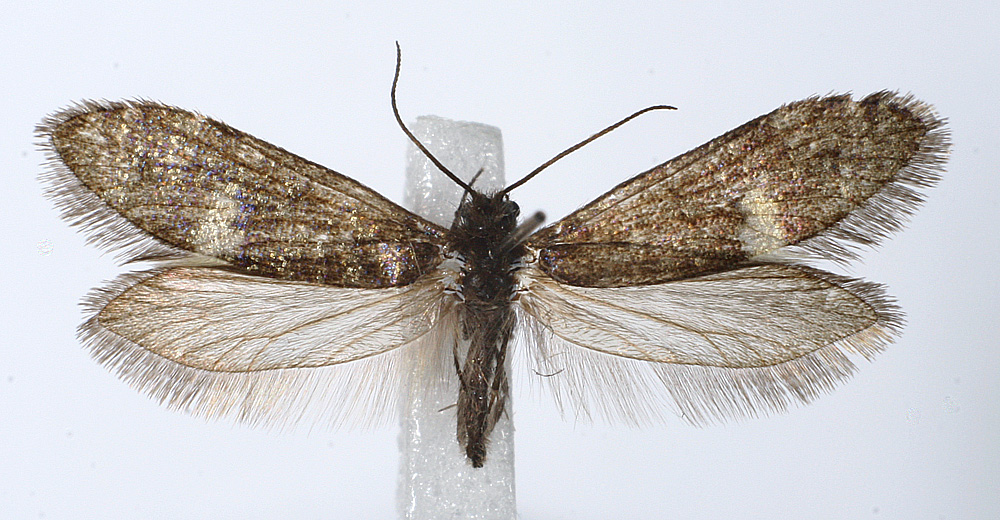

Scientific classification
- Kingdom: Animalia
- Phylum: Arthropoda
- Clade: Pancrustacea
- Class: Insecta
- Order: Lepidoptera
- Family: Eriocraniidae
- Genus: Eriocrania
- Species: E. sangii

Binomial name
- Eriocrania sangii (Wood, 1891)

Synonyms
- Micropteryx sangii Wood, 1891

= Eriocrania sangii =

Moth species in family Eriocraniidae

Eriocrania sangii, the large birch purple, is a moth of the family Eriocraniidae found in Europe and described by John Henry Wood in 1891. The moth can be found flying in sunshine around birch trees and the larvae feed on birch leaves.

== Description ==
The wingspan is 9–14 mm. Edward Meyrick gives this description: head whitish-grey-ochreous, more or less mixed with dark fuscous. Antennae 1/2. Forewings elongate, bronzy-purple, with more or less numerous pale shining golden irregular spots: a subtriangular pale golden dorsal spot before tornus, reaching half across wing; cilia bronzy-grey, on dorsal spot ochreous-whitish; 9 absent. Hindwings bronzy-grey, towards apex purplish-tinged. Larva grey; head black, centre and mouth brown; 2 with two groups of black spots: in brownish blotch in leaves of birch.;Similar species E. sangii looks similar to E. semipurpurella and can only be told apart by microscopy of the genitalia.

The moth can be found flying in sunshine, around birch trees, in March and April. In dull weather they rest on twigs.*

Ovum

Eggs are laid in a leaf bud of birch.

Larvae

The grey larvae mine the leaves of birch (Betula species). The mine starts as a short gallery, close to a leaf margin and develops into a large, white, full depth blotch. Frass is in long threads. The leaf mines can be found from the end of March until May and when vacated, the mine shrivels and withers away. Larvae feed on downy birch (Betula pendula), silver birch (Betula pubescens).

Pupa

Pupation is in the soil, within a tough silken cocoon.

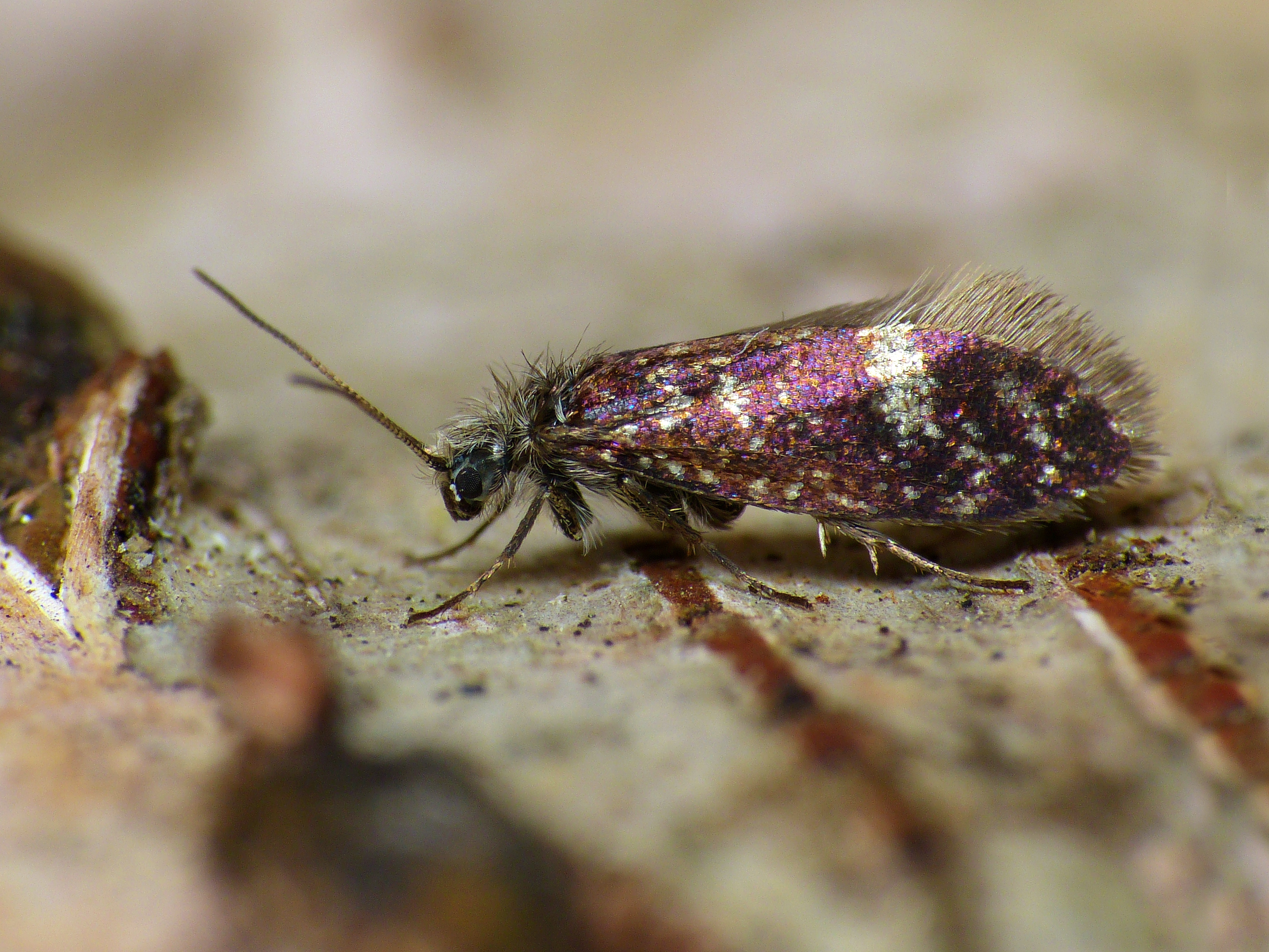
Female

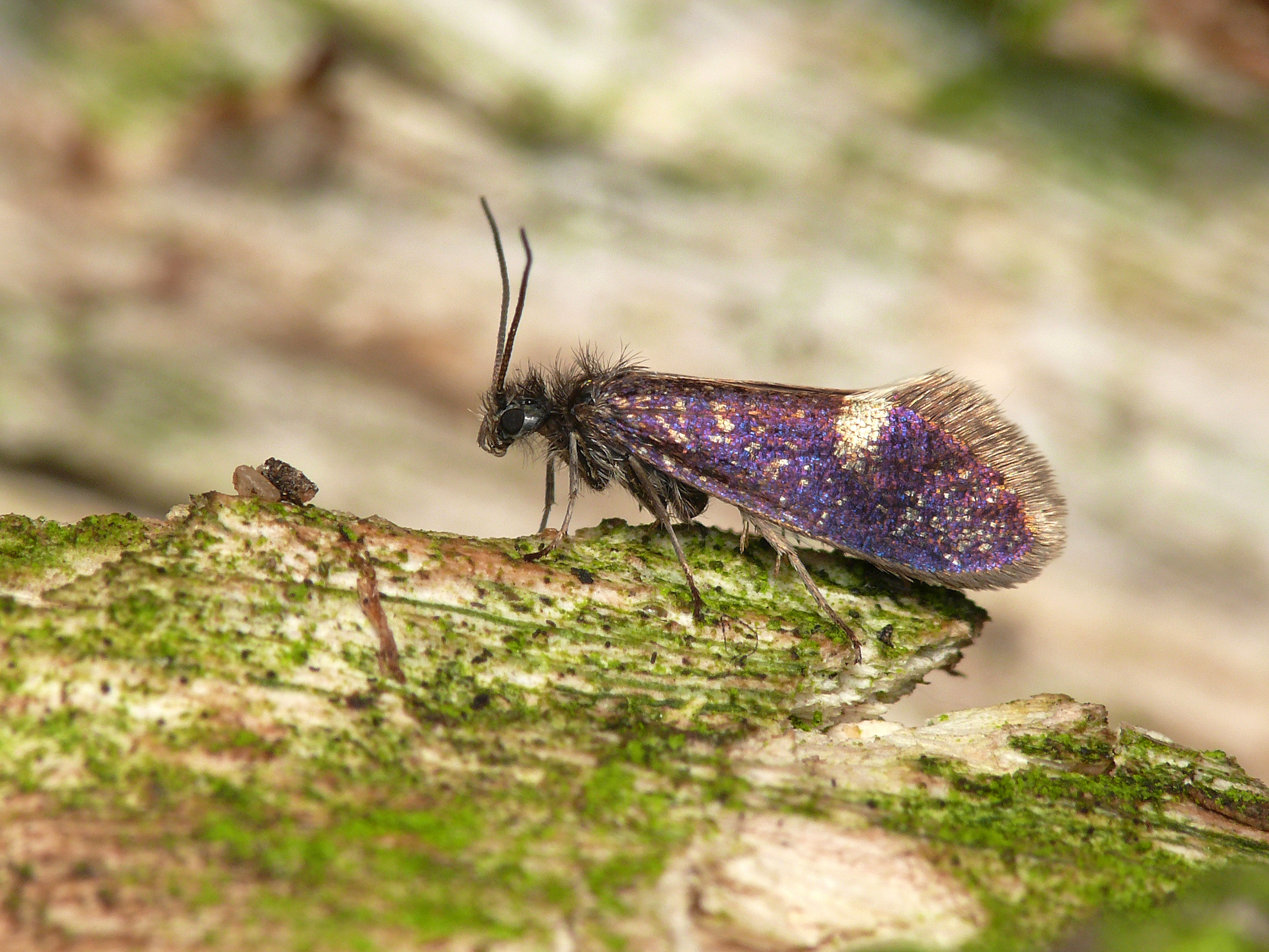
Male

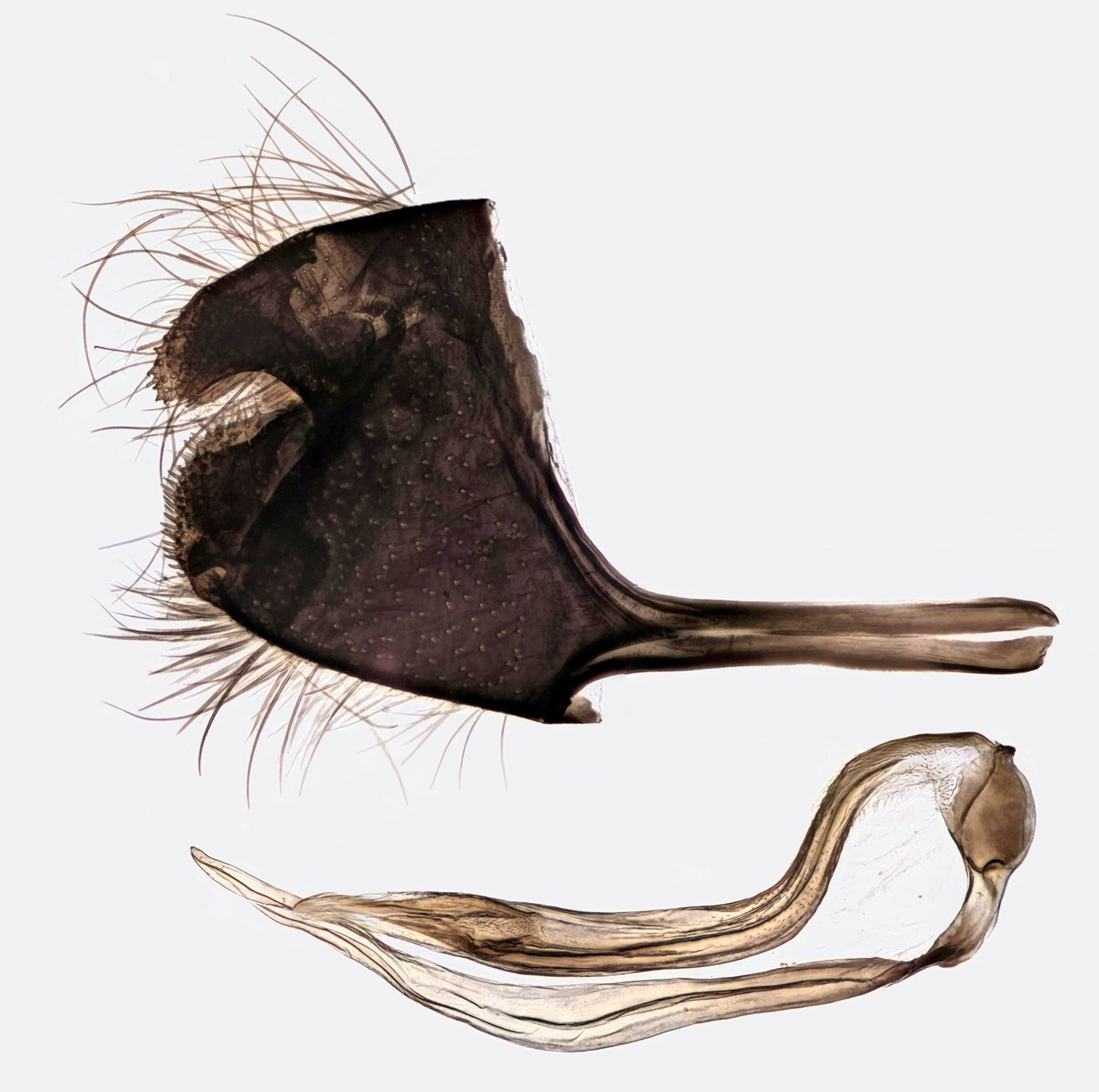
Genitalia (male)

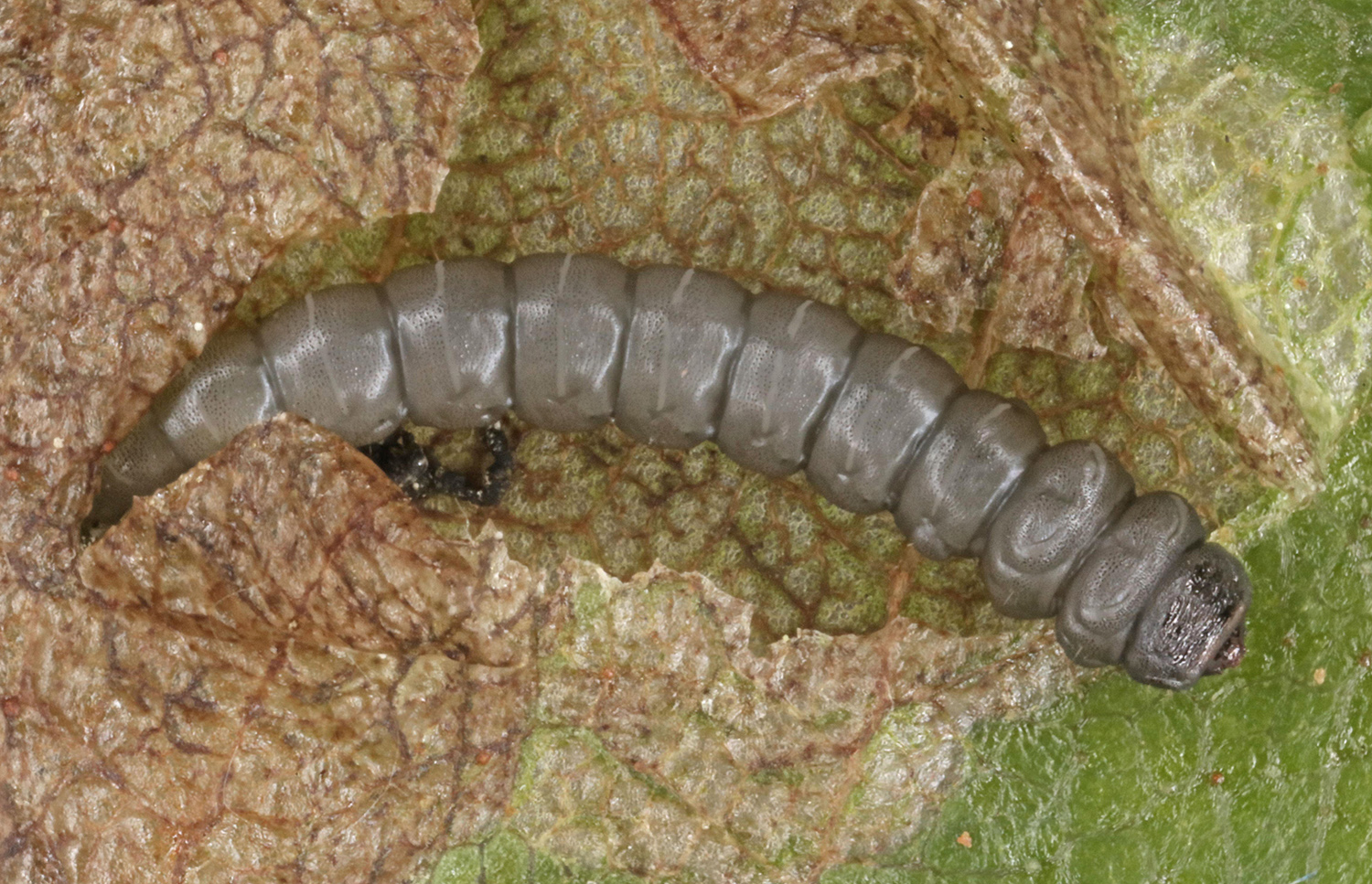
Larva

== Etymology ==
The moth was described by Woods from a specimen found in Tarrington, Herefordshire, England, naming the moth, Micropteryx sangii. The genus Micropteryx was raised by the German entomologist, Jacob Hübner in 1825 and comes from the Greek for mikros, little and pterux, a wing. The moth is now in the genus Eriocrania, which was raised by Philipp Christoph Zeller in 1851. Erion means wool and kranion means the upper part of the head, which refers to the hair-scales on the top of the head. The specific name sangii is named after the lepidopterist J Sang (1828–1887) who was based in the north-east of England.
