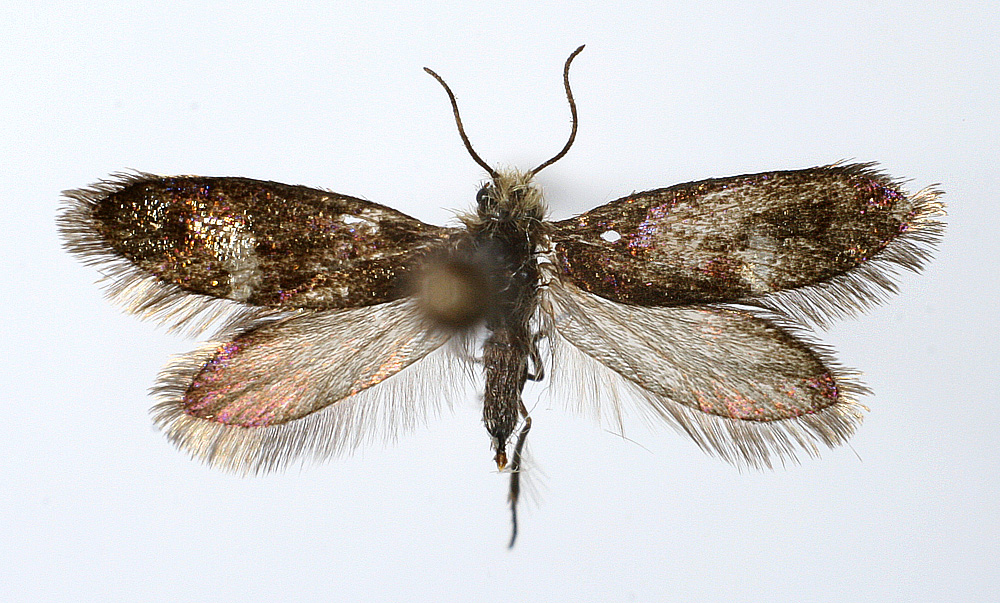

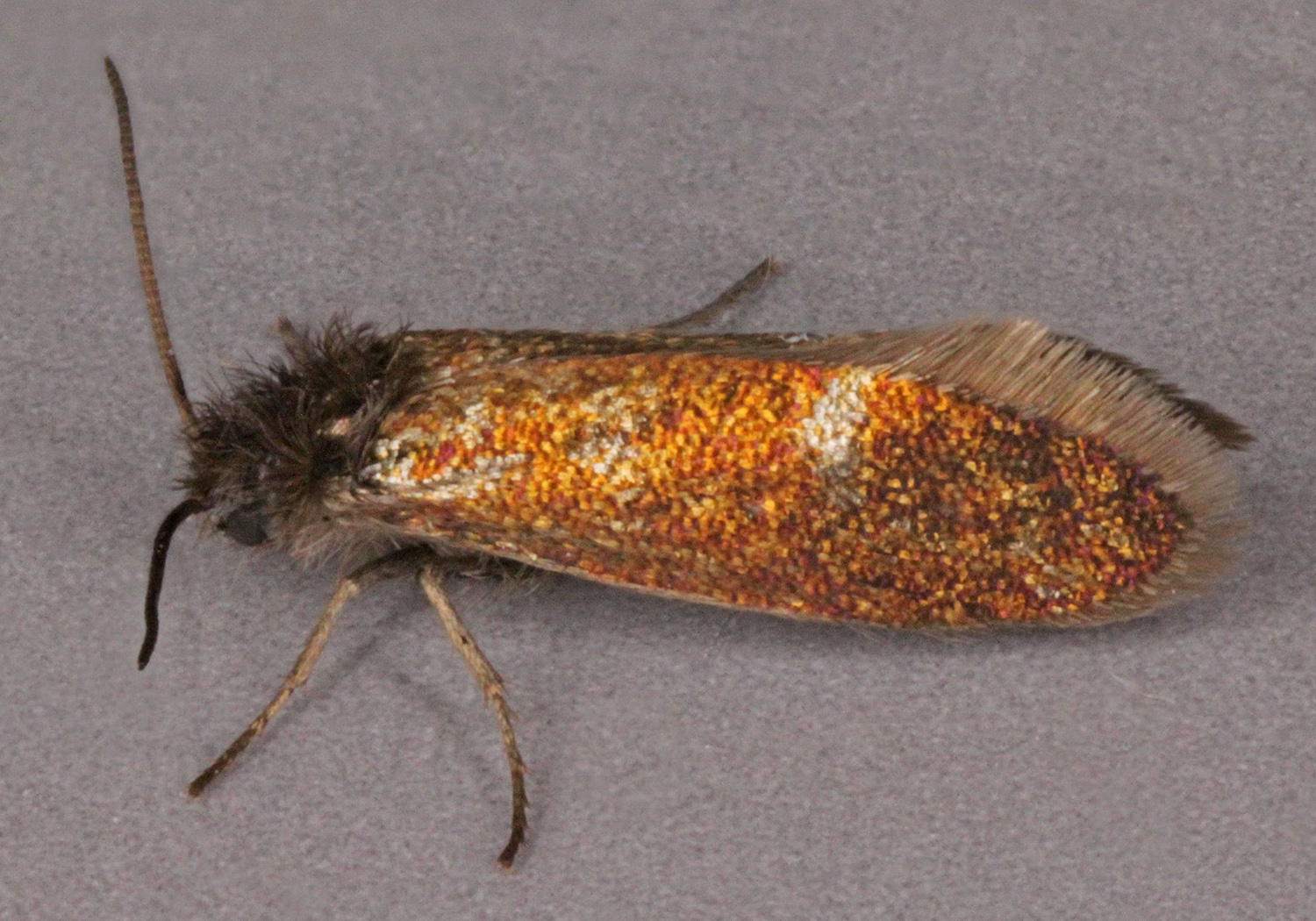

Scientific classification
- Kingdom: Animalia
- Phylum: Arthropoda
- Class: Insecta
- Order: Lepidoptera
- Family: Eriocraniidae
- Genus: Eriocrania
- Species: E. unimaculella

Binomial name
- Eriocrania unimaculella (Zetterstedt, 1839)

Synonyms
- Adela unimaculella Zetterstedt, 1839; Heringocrania unimaculella Zetterstedt, 1839; Micropterix unimaculella

= Eriocrania unimaculella =

Moth species in family Eriocraniidae

Eriocrania unimaculella (also known as the White-spot Purple) is a moth of the family Eriocraniidae found in Europe. It was first described by the Swedish naturalist Johan Wilhelm Zetterstedt in 1839. The larvae feed inside the leaves of birch (Betula species), making a mine.

== Description ==
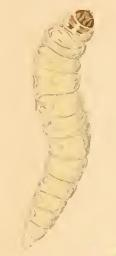
Larva

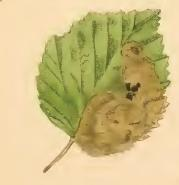
A mined birch leaf

The wingspan is about 1 cm. The head is fuscous, mixed with ochreous-whitish. The forewings are elongate, bronzy-purple, more or less sprinkled with pale shining golden and there is a narrow slightly curved transverse white dorsal spot before the tornus, reaching about half across the wing; cilia grey Vein 9 is present. The hindwings are grey, posteriorly purplish-tinged. The larva is whitish; head brown, mouth darker, posterior lobes showing through segment 2 as blackish spots; segment 6 with small projections. The moth flies from March to April and is the only one of the Eriocraniidae which does not have the distinct golden mottling and a whitish tornal spot; they have purple forewings.

Ovum

Eggs are laid in the leaf-buds of birch.

Larva

Larvae can be found in April and May, are whitish with a brown head and have papillae (small lumps) on the first thoracic segment which show as blackish spots. They mine the leaves of birch (Betula species), forming a large, white, full depth blotch which withers and disintegrate by late summer. The frass is in long threads and the mine can only be identified when the larva can be seen. Mines have been found on silver birch (Betula pendula) and downy birch (Betula pubescens).

Pupa

The larvae overwinter as a pupa in the soil, in a tough silken cocoon.

== Distribution ==
The moth is found in Europe; from Great Britain, Ireland and France in the west, north to Scandinavia and east to Russia. The species has been considered invasive and spreading rapidly in Iceland since 2005.

== Etymology ==
The moth was originally named Adela unimaculella and described by Zetterstedt in 1839 from a specimen found in Southern Lapland. Adela was raised by the French zoologist, Pierre André Latreille in 1796. Adela means unseen, from the larval habit of concealing itself in a portable case (but not in the case of this species of moth). Until recently, the moth was in the genus Eriocrania, which was raised by Philipp Christoph Zeller in 1851. Erion means wool and kranion means the upper part of the head, which refers to the hair-scales on the top of the head. The moth is now in the monotypic genus Heringocrania. The specific name unimaculella is from unus – one, and macula – referring to the white spot on the forewing.
