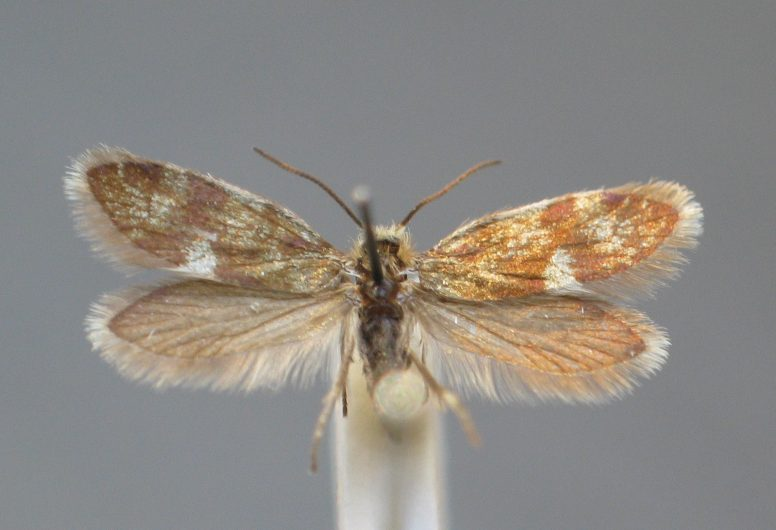

Scientific classification
- Domain: Eukaryota
- Kingdom: Animalia
- Phylum: Arthropoda
- Class: Insecta
- Order: Lepidoptera
- Family: Eriocraniidae
- Genus: Eriocrania
- Species: E. alpinella

Binomial name
- Eriocrania alpinella Burmann, 1958

= Eriocrania alpinella =

Moth species in family Eriocraniidae

Eriocrania alpinella is a moth of the family Eriocraniidae, found in Central Europe, including Austria and Switzerland and possibly neighbouring countries.

The wingspan is 10.5-11.5 mm and the moth flies in June and July.

The larvae mine the leaves of green alder (Alnus viridis).
