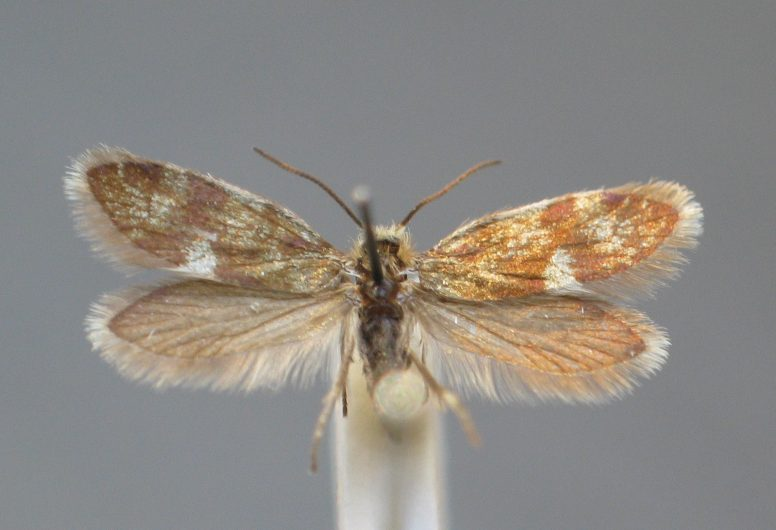
- Eriocrania alpinella

Scientific classification
- Domain: Eukaryota
- Kingdom: Animalia
- Phylum: Arthropoda
- Class: Insecta
- Order: Lepidoptera
- Family: Eriocraniidae
- Genus: Eriocrania; Zeller, 1851

Species
- Many, see text

Synonyms
- Allochapmania Strand, 1917; Chapmania Spuler, 1910; Heringocrania Kusnezov, 1941; Paracrania

= Eriocrania =

Moth genus in family Eriocraniidae

Eriocrania is a Palearctic genus of moth of the family Eriocraniidae. The moths are diurnal, flying in sunshine, and the larvae are leaf miners, forming blotches in leaves.

== Description ==
The moths are diurnal flying in sunshine, at dawn during March, April and May. They often fly around the host trees. On cold, sunny days they can be found on the branches, and by beating a branch over a beating tray can be seen motionless, when they fall on to the cloth. At rest the wings are held at a steep angle and are purple or golden, sometimes with net-like or mottled markings. The head has spiky scales on top. Many of the adults are difficult to tell apart and can only be identified by genitalia dissection. Eggs are laid in a leaf bud or the parenchyma of a leaf. Larvae are white or gray and mine leaves, forming large blotches with long, intertwining strands of frass, on the leaves of birches (Betula species), hazel (Corylus species), hornbeam (Carpinus species) or oaks (Quercus species). The mines appear in the spring, shortly after the leaves are fully open. Pupation takes place in the soil within a tough silken cocoon.

== Etymology ==
The generic name was raised by Philipp Christoph Zeller in 1851. Eriocrania means woolly-headed, from the Greek, erion – wool and kranion – upper part of the head.

== Species ==
- Eriocrania alpinella
- Eriocrania breviapex
- Eriocrania carpinella
- Eriocrania chrysolepidella
- Eriocrania cicatricella
- Eriocrania komaii
- Eriocrania sakhalinella
- Eriocrania salopiella
- Eriocrania sangii
- Eriocrania semipurpurella
- Eriocrania sparrmannella
- Eriocrania unimaculella
