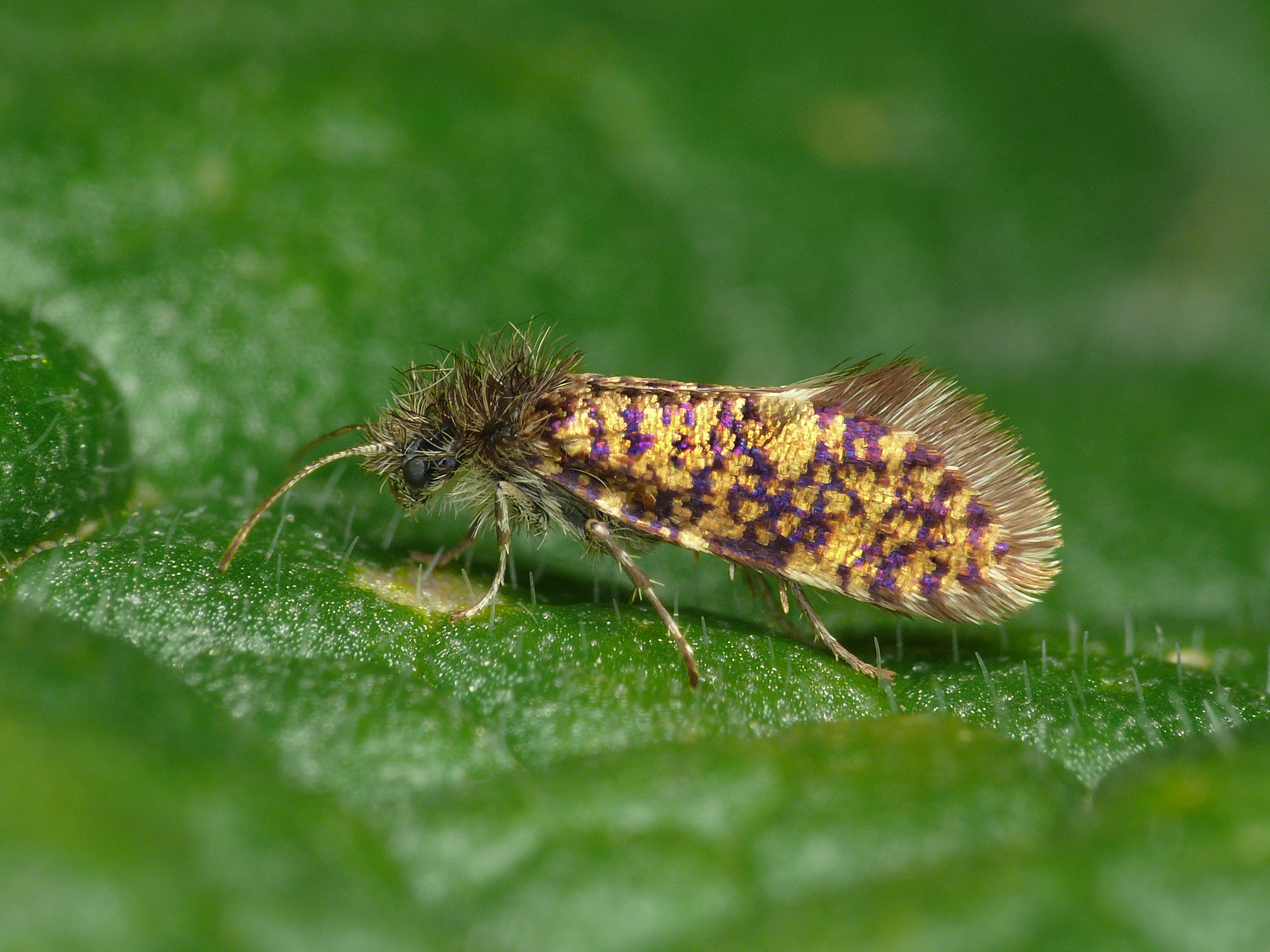

Scientific classification
- Domain: Eukaryota
- Kingdom: Animalia
- Phylum: Arthropoda
- Class: Insecta
- Order: Lepidoptera
- Family: Eriocraniidae
- Genus: Eriocrania
- Species: E. sparrmannella

Binomial name
- Eriocrania sparrmannella (Bosc, 1791)

Synonyms
- Tinea sparrmannella Bosc, 1791; Allochapmania sparrmannella; Chapmania sparrmannella; Lampronia sparrmannella

= Eriocrania sparrmannella =

Moth species in family Eriocraniidae

Eriocrania sparrmannella also known as the mottled purple is a moth of the family Eriocraniidae, found in Europe and Japan. It was first described by the French entomologist, Louis Augustin Guillaume Bosc in 1791. The specific name honours the Swedish naturalist Anders Erikson Sparrman. The larvae mine the leaves of birch (Betula species).

== Description ==
The wingspan is 10–13 mm (0.39–0.51 in). The head is pale grey, mixed with dark fuscous. The forewings are rather short and broad, pale shining golden and strongly and sharply strigulated with purple. There is a narrow erect dorsal spot of ground-colour before the tornus, reaching half across the wing; cilia grey, sometimes obscurely barred with ochreous-whitish. Vein 9 is absent. The hindwings are rather dark grey, towards apex purplish tinged. The larva is whitish with a brown head, sides blackish and two marks on segment 2 outlined with brown.

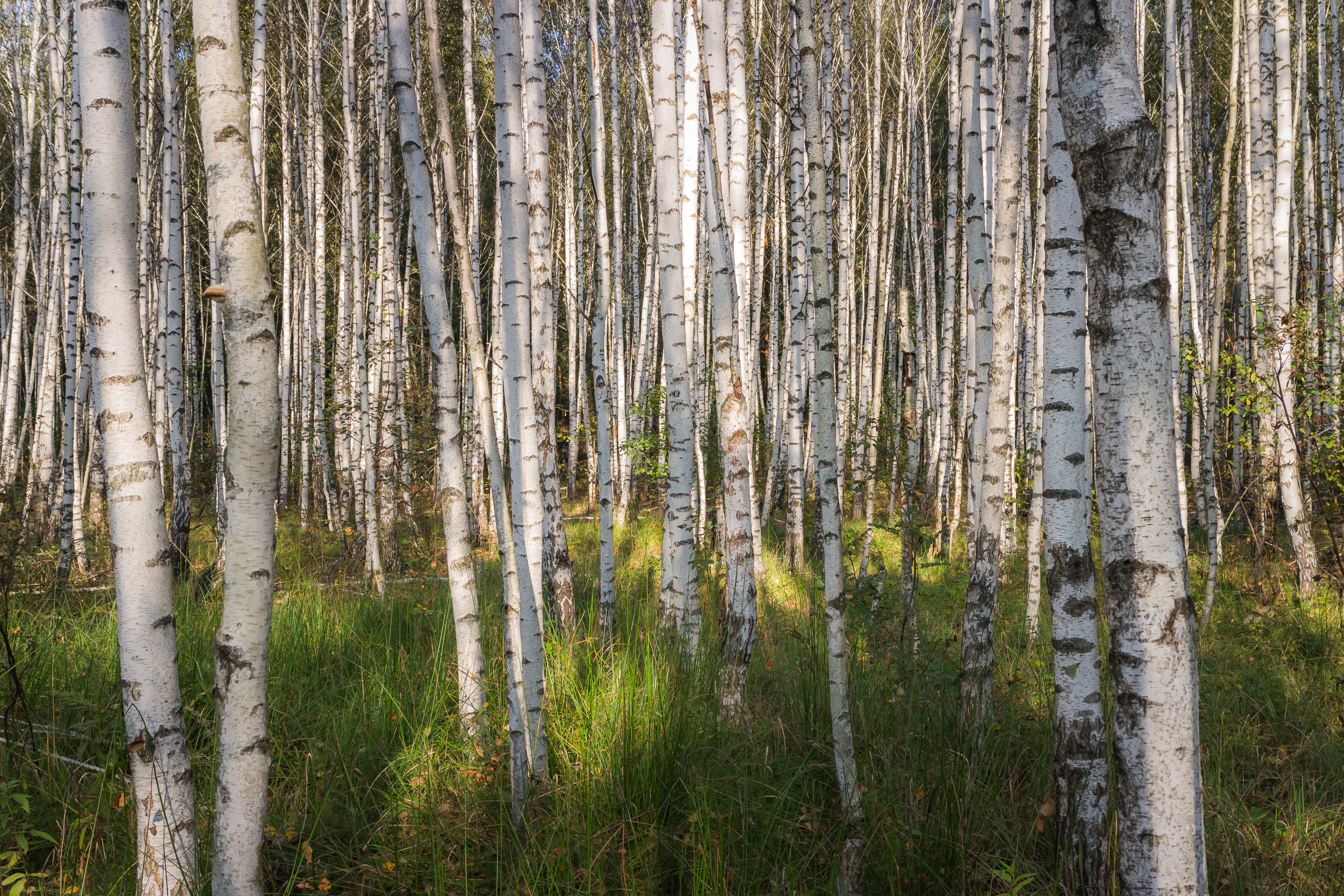
Birch habitat. Russia

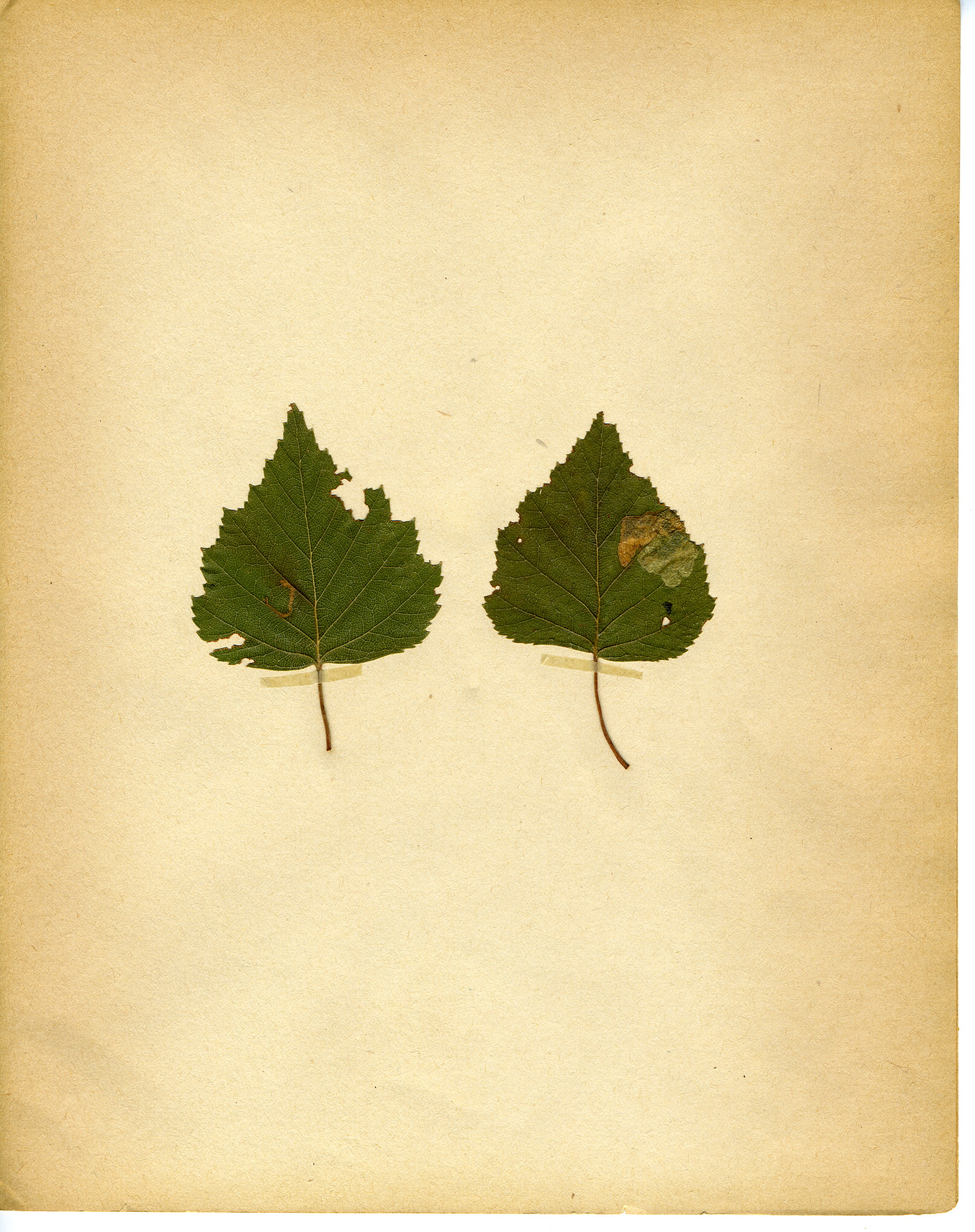
Leaf mines

The moth flies in April and May depending on the location, and can be found during the day flying around birch.

Ovum

Eggs are laid on the leaves of birch.

Larva

Larvae are whitish with a brown head. They feed inside a leaf, starting as a linear mine near the midrib, which widens to a blotch. The frass is in long threads. They hibernate in the soil.

Pupa

The larvae pupate in a tough cocoon in the soil in the spring.

== Distribution ==
This moth is found in most of Europe and in Japan.

== Etymology ==
Bosc described the moth from a specimen found in Paris, France. He initially allocated the moth to the genus, Tinea, which means – wings wrapped round the body so as to almost form a cylinder. The present genus Eriocrani, literally means woolly-headed, i.e. rough-haired, referring to the scales on the top of the head. The name is split with erion referring to wool and kranion the upper part of the head. The specific name honours the Swedish entomologist Anders Erikson Sparrman (1748–1820).
