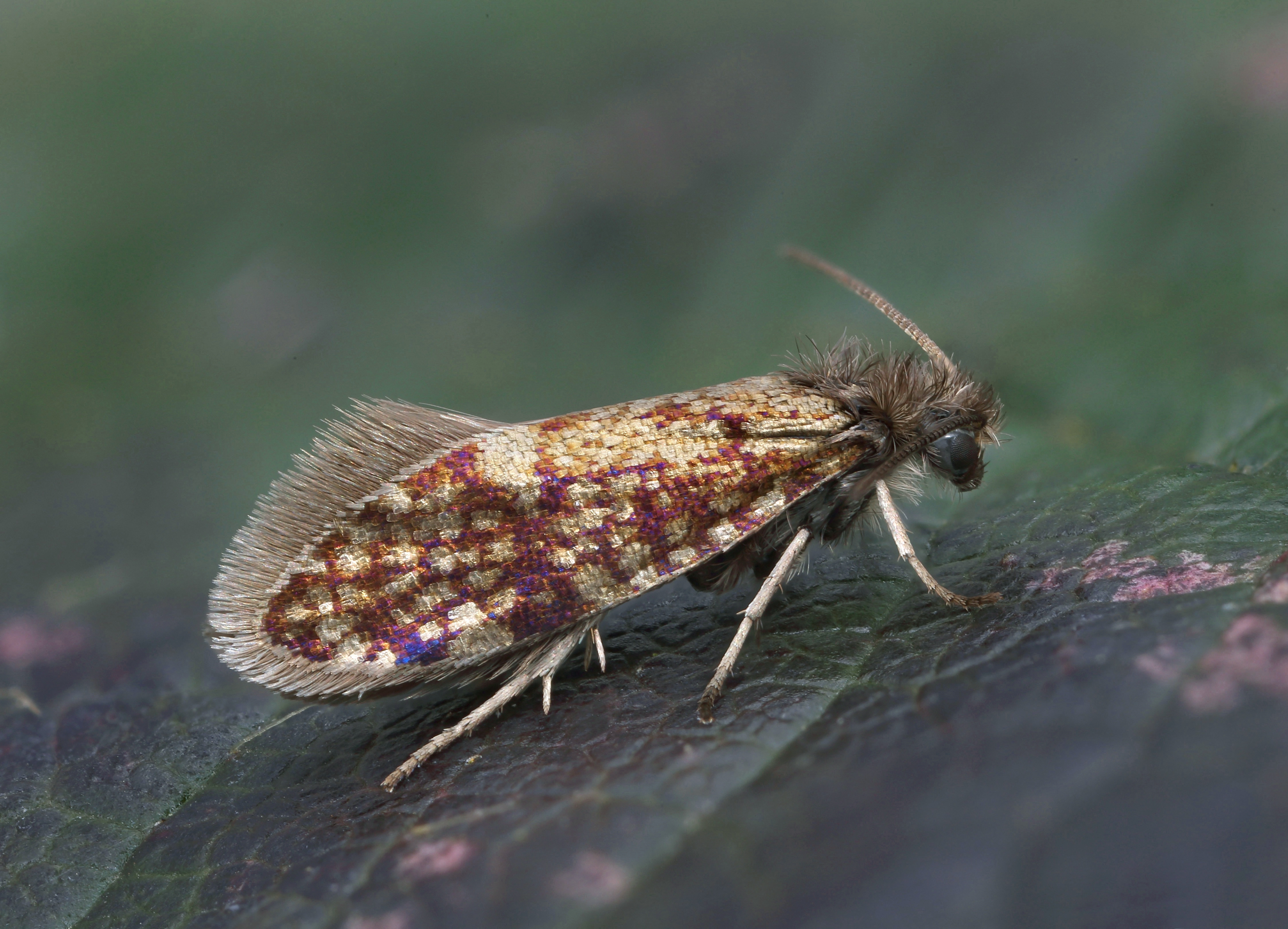

Scientific classification
- Kingdom: Animalia
- Phylum: Arthropoda
- Clade: Pancrustacea
- Class: Insecta
- Order: Lepidoptera
- Family: Eriocraniidae
- Genus: Eriocrania
- Species: E. cicatricella

Binomial name
- Eriocrania cicatricella (Zetterstedt, 1839)

Synonyms
- Adela cicatricella Zetterstedt, 1839; Eriocrania haworthi Bradley, 1966; Tinea purpurella Haworth, 1828; Eriocrania purpurella

= Eriocrania cicatricella =

Moth species in family Eriocraniidae

Eriocrania cicatricella is a moth of the family Eriocraniidae found in Europe. It was first described by Johan Wilhelm Zetterstedt in 1839. The larvae mine the leaves of birch (Betula species).

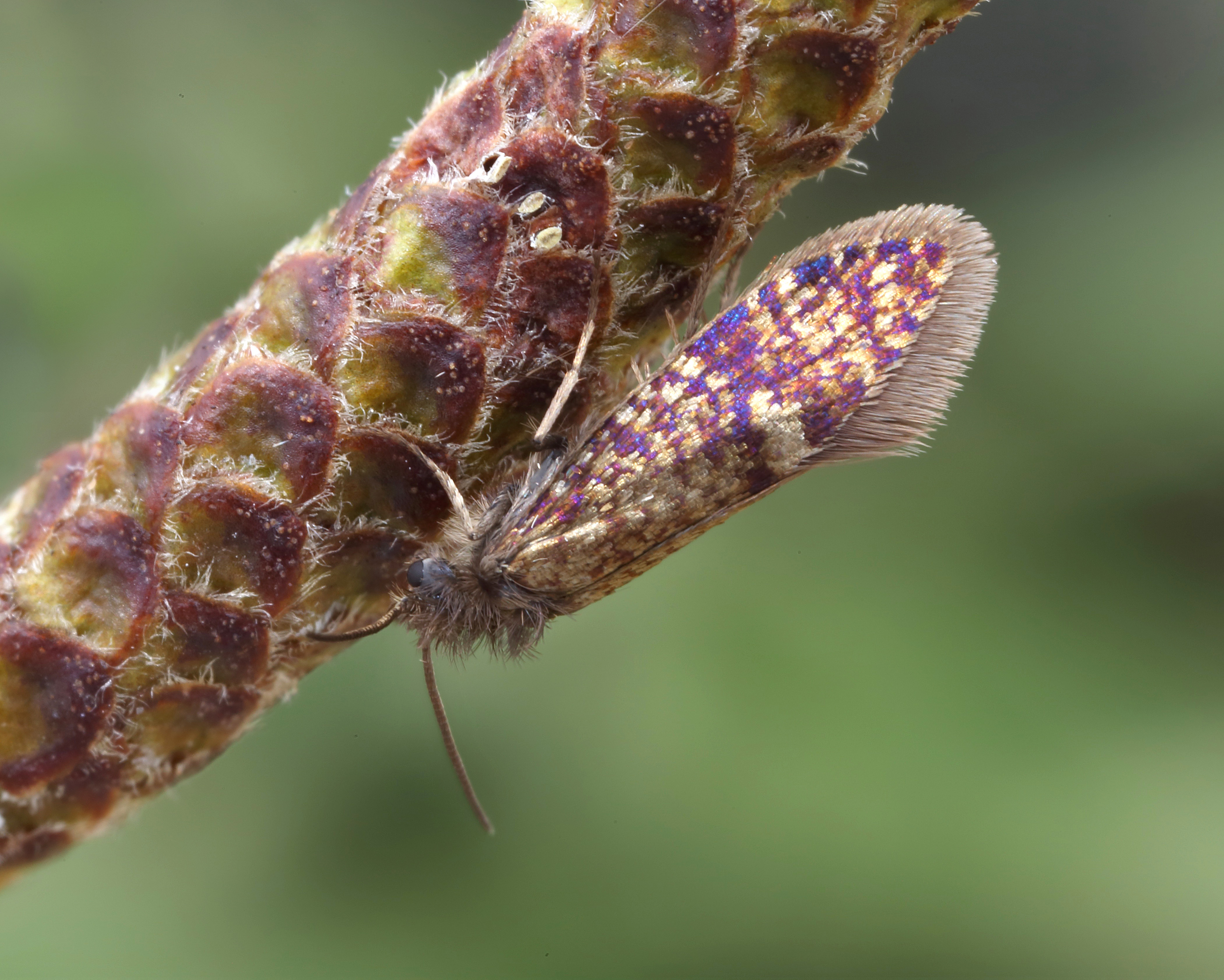

== Description ==
The wingspan is about 11 mm. The head is fuscous, somewhat mixed with grey-whitish. The forewings are rather elongate, pale shining golden, strigulated and spotted with purple and the veins posteriorly purple. There is a rather indistinct transverse dorsal spot of ground-colour before the tornus, not reaching half across wing; cilia light grey. Vein 9 is absent. The hindwings are grey, towards apex purplish-tinged.

== Biology ==
The moth flies in April around the larval food plant.

Eggs are laid in the leaf buds of birch (Betula species) and the white larvae mine the leaves in May. Larvae have swollen thoracic segments. The mine is a greenish blotch and contains two to four larvae. Several species of the Eriocraniidae may mine the same leaf and mines can merge, so care needs to be taken when identifying mines.

== Etymology ==
Zetterstedt originally put the moth in the genus Adela, which was raised by the French zoologist, Pierre André Latreille in 1796. The name comes from the Greek adelos, which describes the larval habit of concealing itself in a portable case; although in the case of this moth, the larvae live within the tissue of a leaf! The moth is now in the genus Eriocrania, which was raised by Philipp Christoph Zeller in 1851. Erion means wool and kranion means the upper part of the head, which refers to the hair-scales on the top of the head. The specific name, cicatricella is from cicatrix, a scar – referring to the indistinct transverse dorsal spot.

== Distribution ==
Eriocrania cicatricella is found from Britain and Ireland east to Russia.

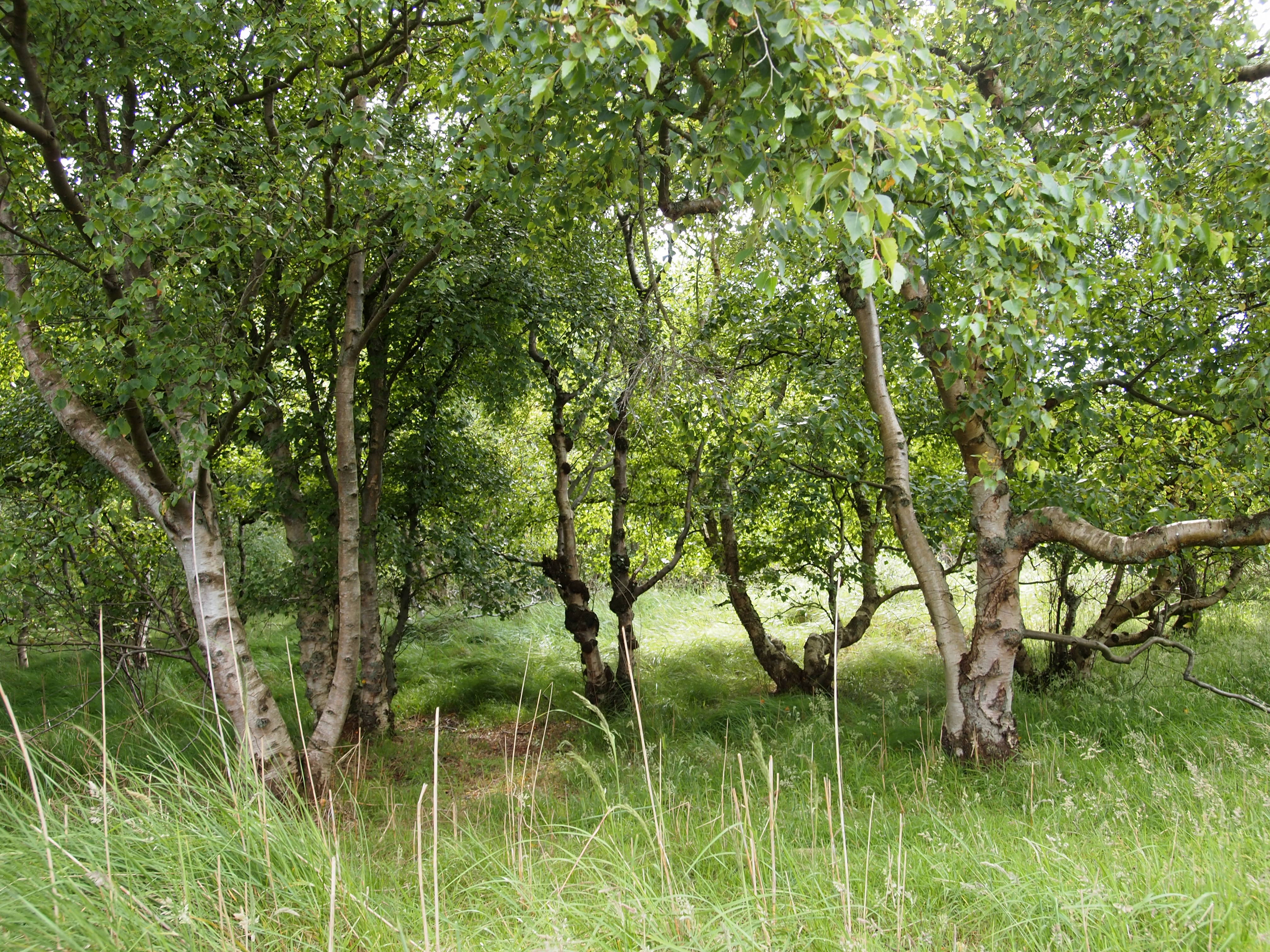
Habitat. Netherlands
