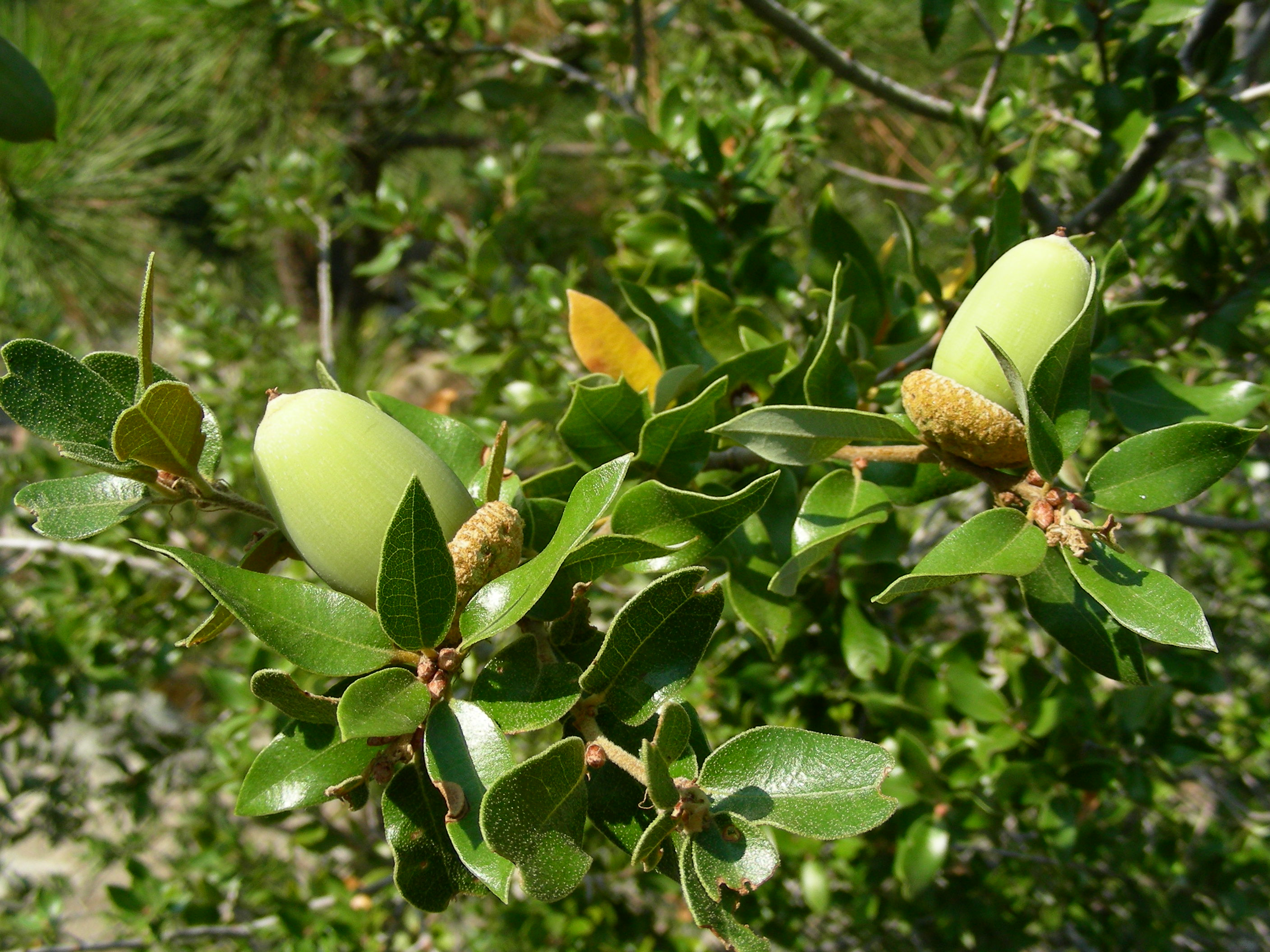
- Leaves and acorns

Conservation status
- Least Concern (IUCN 3.1)

Scientific classification
- Kingdom: Plantae
- Clade: Embryophytes
- Clade: Tracheophytes
- Clade: Angiosperms
- Clade: Eudicots
- Clade: Rosids
- Order: Fagales
- Family: Fagaceae
- Genus: Quercus
- Subgenus: Quercus subg. Quercus
- Section: Quercus sect. Protobalanus
- Species: Q. chrysolepis

Binomial name
- Quercus chrysolepis Liebm.
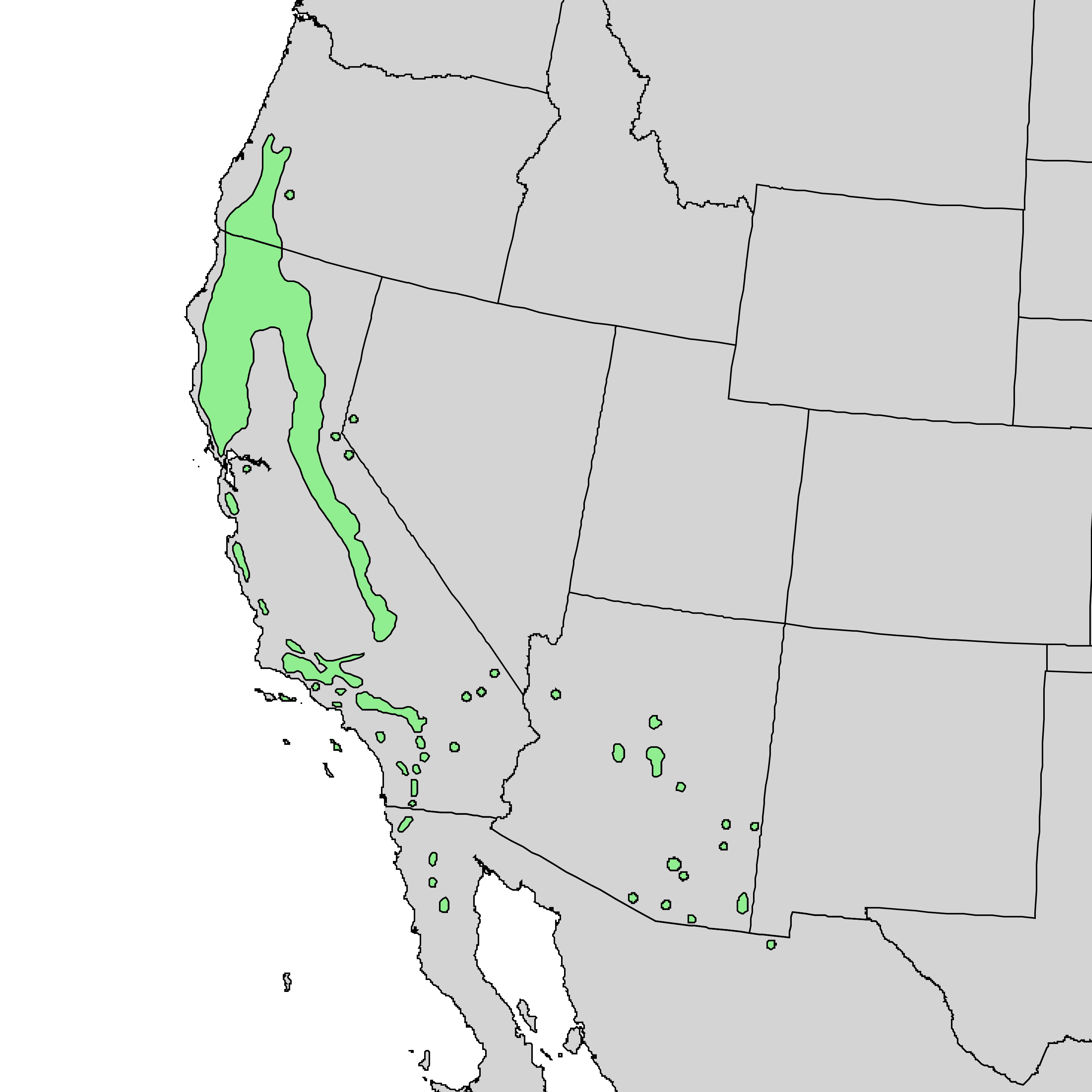
- Natural range of Quercus chrysolepis

Synonyms
- Quercus chrysophyllus Kellogg; Quercus crassipocula Torr.; Quercus fulvescens Kellogg; Quercus oblongifolia R.Br.; Quercus wilcoxii Rydb.

= Quercus chrysolepis =

Species of oak tree

Quercus chrysolepis, commonly termed canyon live oak, canyon oak, golden cup oak or maul oak, is a North American species of evergreen oak. Its leaves are a glossy dark green on the upper surface with prominent spines; a further identification arises from the leaves of canyon live oak being geometrically flat.

The species is found in Mexico and in the western United States, notably in the California Coast Ranges. It is often found near creeks and drainage swales growing in moist cool microhabitats.

== Description ==
Quercus chrysolepis is an evergreen tree with significant-sized spreading, horizontal branches, and a broad, rounded crown; it attains a height of 6–30 meters (20–100 feet) and often forms as a shrub. The trunk diameter typically ranges from 30 to 100 centimeters (12 to 39 inches). Exceptionally large specimens are found in the mountains of Southern California, and rank among the largest oaks in North America. The largest known in the San Bernardino Mountains measures 38 m (124 ft) high, with a trunk circumference of 12 m (39 ft 4 in) and a crown spread of 30 m (98 ft). The bark is grayish brown, and rather smooth or sometimes scaly.

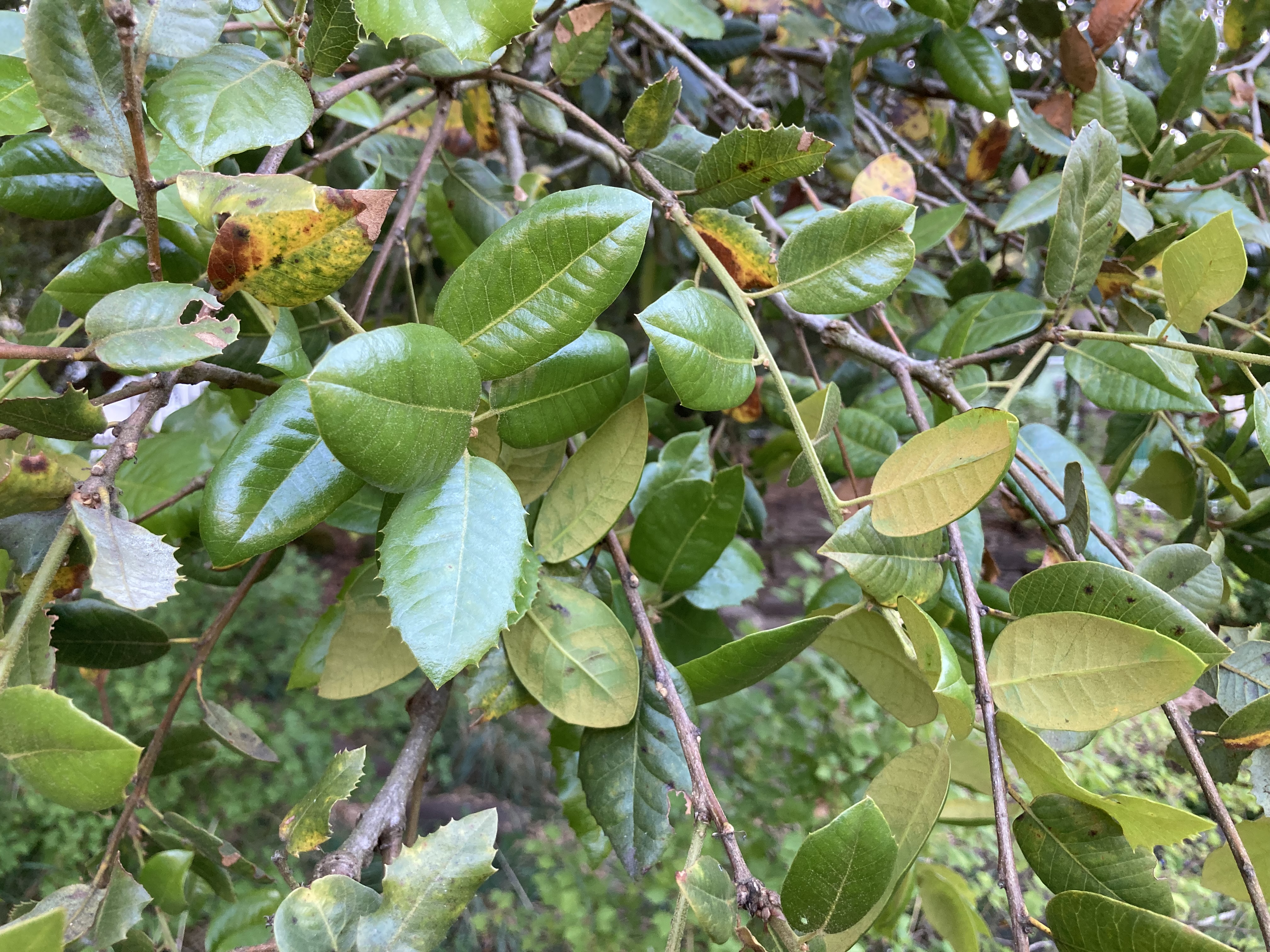
At SF Botanical Garden showing serrated and smooth leaves on same plant.

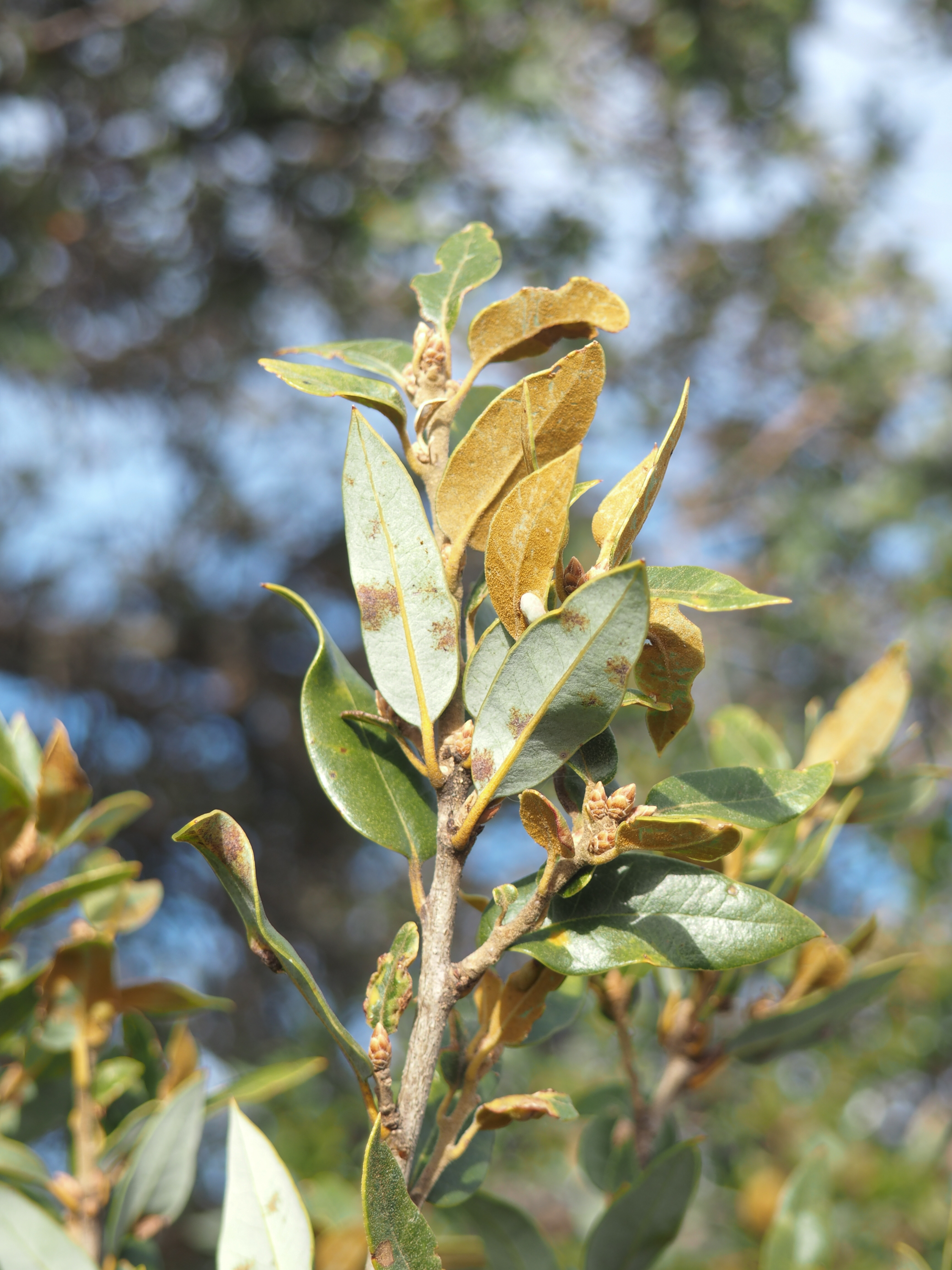
New growth has characteristic golden lower leaf surface

The elliptical to oblong leaves are 2.5 to 8 cm (1 to 3 1/4 in) in length and about half as wide; they are short-pointed at the tip, and rounded or blunt at base. Although the leaves appear generally flat, they may have edge margins slightly turned under, typically with spiny teeth, particularly on young twigs. These leathery leaves are a glossy dark green above, with a nether surface a dull golden down, often becoming gray and nearly glabrous the second year. The species name chrysolepis comes from two Greek roots, chrysos meaning "golden" and lepis meaning "scales" or "skin" in reference to the golden down on fresh leaves. Leaves can be highly variable, with smooth or serrated edges, or leaves intermediate between the two forms. One of the most variable oaks in California.

This species is monoecious. The male flowers droop in catkins, and the female flowers originate from leaf axils, usually singly.

Acorns occur solitarily or in pairs, exhibiting lengths of 2–5 cm; these fruits are variable in size and shape, but generally ovoid, turban-like with a shallow, thick cup of scales densely covered with yellowish hairs; the stalk is barely evident.

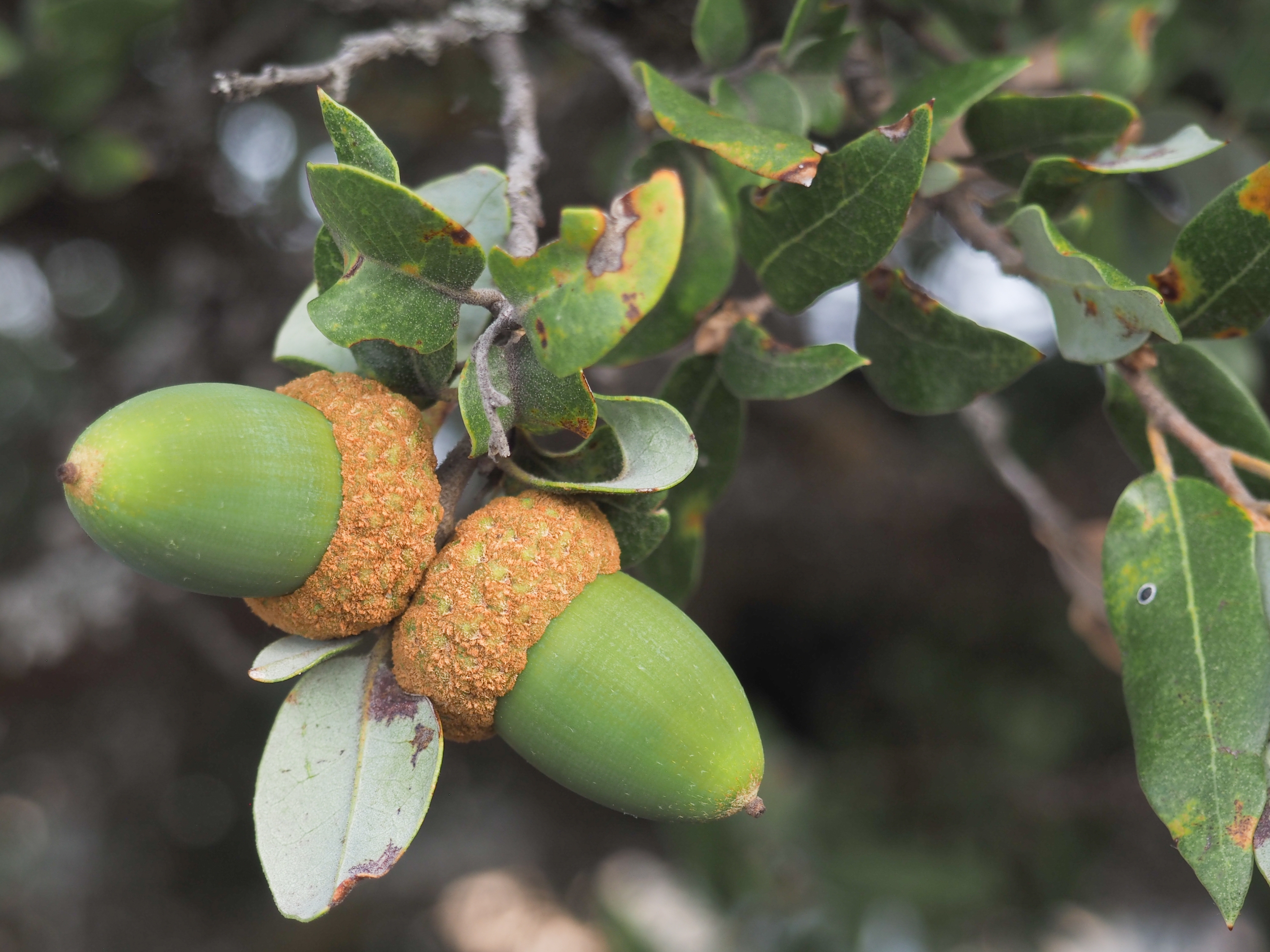
Acorns with distinct golden acorn cups

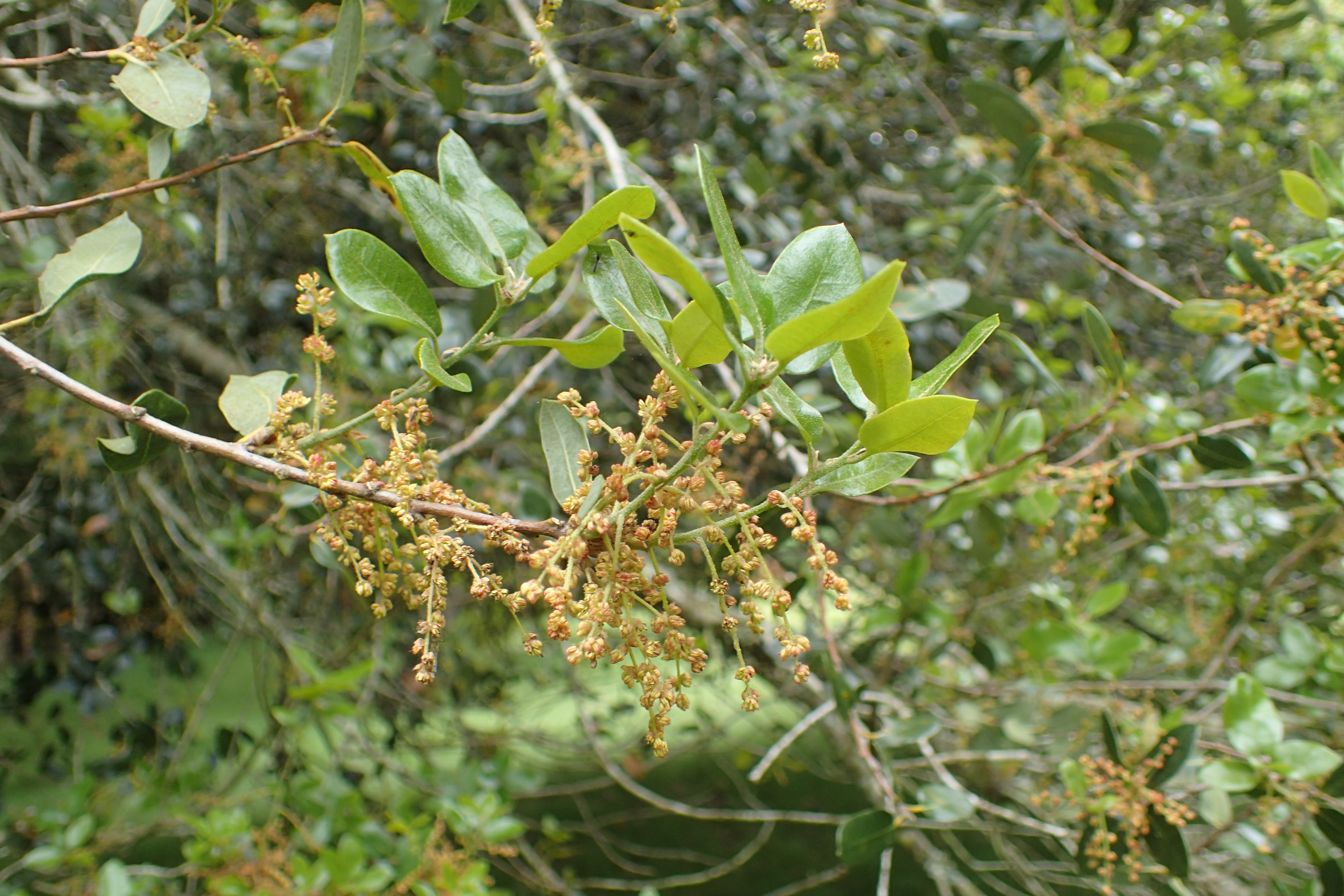
The catkins

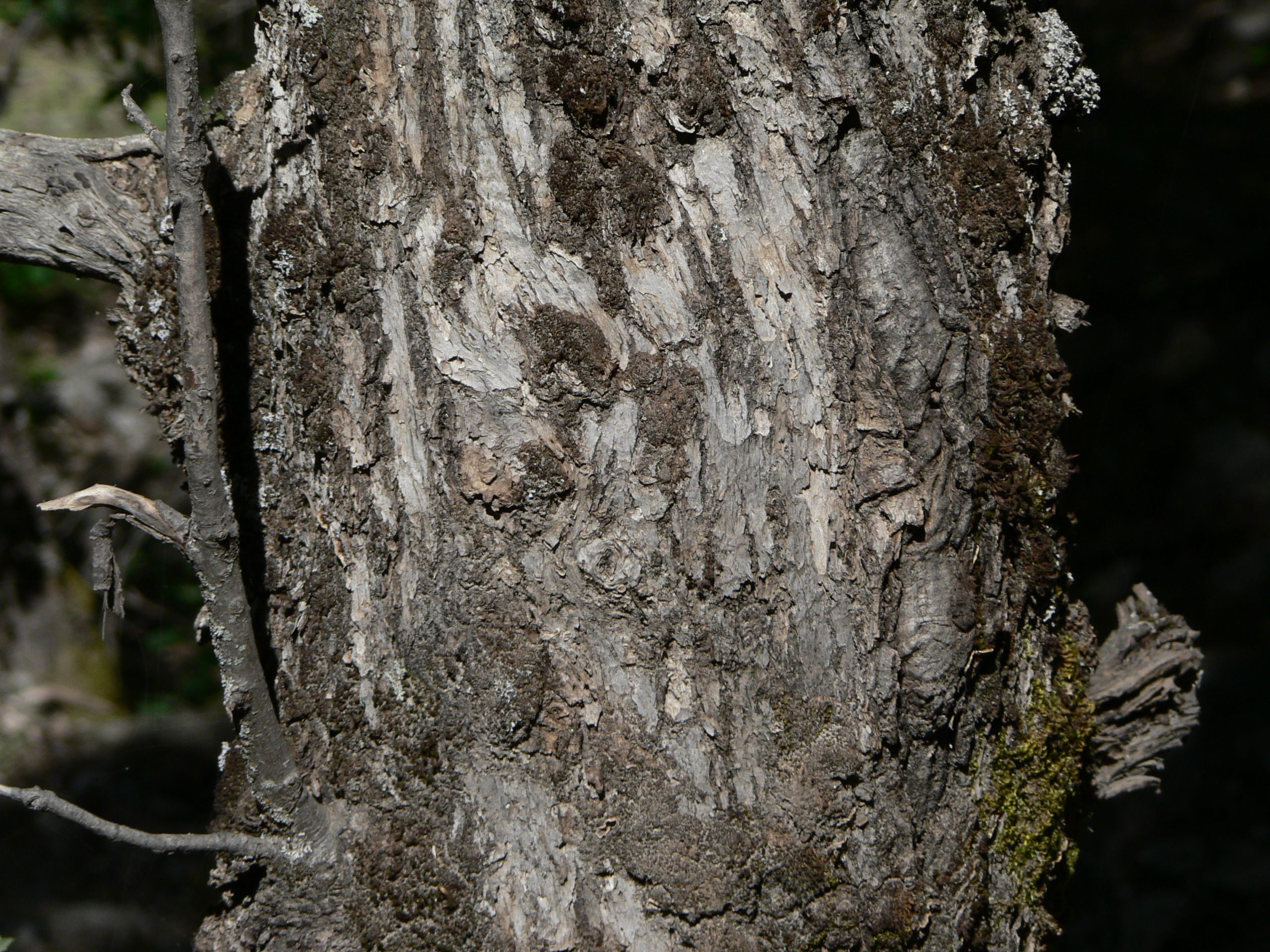
The trunk bark is gray and rough.

== Taxonomy ==
The species is placed in Quercus section Protobalanus. This tree regularly hybridizes with its relatives in the section Protobalanus (golden oaks) including Q. tomentella and Q. palmeri .

== Distribution and habitat ==
Q. chrysolepis is found in a variety of forest communities in the southwestern United States. It is common in the mountainous regions of California (Sierra Nevada, Coast Ranges, Klamath Mountains, Cascades, San Gabriel Mountains, etc.) with additional populations in the Siskiyou Mountains of southwestern Oregon, western Nevada, northern Baja California, Arizona, southwestern New Mexico, and Chihuahua. Southwestern New Mexico population are most likely the result of introgression from Quercus palmeri to Q. chrysolepis. Those populations tend to be intermediate in overall morphology, but all lack the diagnostic trichomes and biochemical markers of Q. palmeri; they are best classified as Q. chrysolepis affinity Q. palmer.

Canyon live oak is tolerant of a variety of soil types, including very rocky or cobbly environments. It is hardy to cold temperatures down to −11 °F, and will grow in neutral to moderately acidic soils with pH ranges of 4.5 to 7.5. An example of very rocky and serpentine soil tolerance is the species occurrence at the Cedars of Sonoma County, California. Canyon live oak grows at elevations of about 500 to 1,500 m (1,600 to 4,900 ft) in southwestern Oregon; in Northern California, from 100 to 1,400 m (330 to 4,590 ft); and in Southern California, up to approximately 2,700 m (8,900 ft). Q. chrysolepis can be the dominant tree on steep canyon walls, especially in locations of shallow rocky soils. In areas of moderate to high rainfall, it occurs on south facing slopes, and in the hotter, drier parts of its distribution, on northerly slope faces.

Fossil data supports a much wider distribution throughout the western U.S. during the early Holocene period.

== Ecology ==
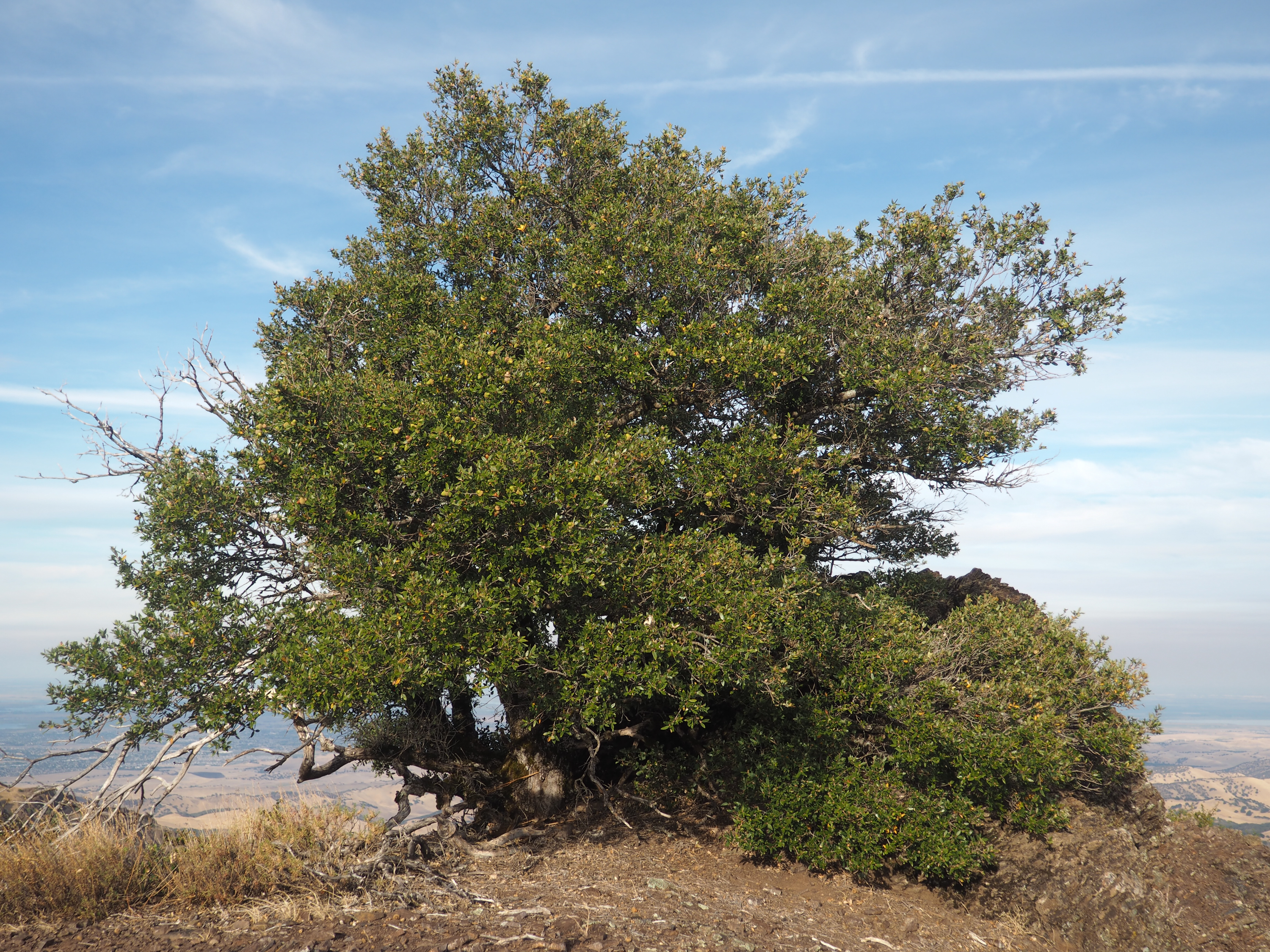
A specimen with compact, shrubby growth habit on dry, exposed site near summit of Mount Diablo.

The species is often sympatric with Quercus agrifolia and several other oak species. It is more shade tolerant than Pacific madrone but not as much as the associated Douglas-fir, tanoak, and golden chinkapin. After forest fires, canyon live oak regenerates vigorously by basal sprouting, and the clonal diversity of this species has been shown to be high. It is typically succeeded by other species except in more extreme dry and rocky climates, being exceptionally drought tolerant.

The acorns are consumed by a variety of wildlife as diverse as acorn woodpecker, California ground squirrel, dusky-footed wood rat, western harvest mouse and black-tailed deer. There seems to be little difference in food preference by wildlife among different oaks. Extensive hybridization of Q. chrysolepis has been documented with several other sympatric oak species, probably to a greater extent than for any other Quercus species. The ability of Q. chrysolepis to compete with other dominant trees within its range has been analyzed from the standpoint of leaf architecture and photosynthetic capability. The study results explain that, in low light environments, Q. chrysolepis out-competes species with superior leaf size and crown mass per unit volume by its greater photosynthetic efficiency and leaf lifespan.

Canyon live oak gives functional habitat for many fauna by providing perching, nesting, resting, or foraging sites for numerous species of birds, and shade and cover for diverse other mammals. Young Q. chrysolepis is a readily available browse. Canyon live oak woodlands serve as excellent mountain lion habitat because of the large population of deer frequenting these areas. Many species forage on canyon live oak foliage including black-tailed jackrabbit, beaver, brush rabbit, red-backed vole, Sonoma chipmunk, cactus mouse, deer mouse, and porcupine. Pocket gophers often feed on the cambium of young canyon live oaks.

Canyon live oak is a major host plant for the caterpillars of the California sister (Adelpha californica) butterfly. Also, in southern California, Q. chrysolepis is the food plant of a small moth, Neocrania bifasciata.

== Allergenicity ==
The pollen of the canyon live oak is a severe allergen. Pollination occurs in spring.

== Uses ==
The acorns are edible. Native Americans used them as a food staple after leaching the tannins. Its roasted seed is also used as a coffee substitute.

The wood is strong, being referred to as 'maul oak' by European-American settlers who employed it for sledgehammers and wedges. It is sometimes used in paneling and especially as firewood.
