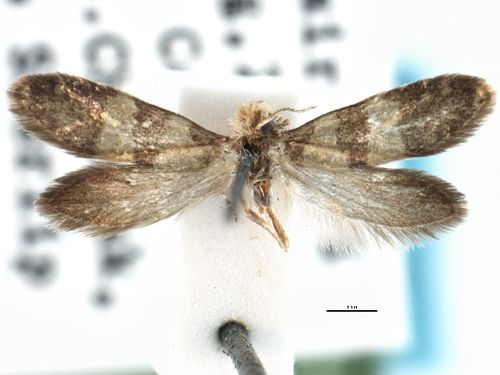

Scientific classification
- Kingdom: Animalia
- Phylum: Arthropoda
- Class: Insecta
- Order: Lepidoptera
- Family: Eriocraniidae
- Genus: Neocrania; Davis, 1978
- Species: N. bifasciata

Binomial name
- Neocrania bifasciata Clarke, 1978

= Neocrania =

Monotypic moth genus in family Eriocraniidae

Neocrania is a genus of moth of the family Eriocraniidae. It contains only one species, Neocrania bifasciata, which is found in the Coast Ranges of southern California.

The wingspan is 8–9 mm for males and 7–10 mm for females. Adults are on wing in early June in one generation per year.

The larvae feed on Quercus chrysolepis.
