= Issikiocrania =

Scientific classification
- Kingdom: Animalia
- Phylum: Arthropoda
- Class: Insecta
- Order: Lepidoptera
- Family: Eriocraniidae
- Genus: Issikiocrania; Moriuti, 1982
- Species: I. japonicella

Binomial name
- Issikiocrania japonicella Moriuti, 1982

Monotypic moth genus in family Eriocraniidae

Issikiocrania is a genus of moths of the family Eriocraniidae. It contains only one species, Issikiocrania japonicella, which is found in Honshu , Japan.

The wingspan is 8–10 mm (0.31–0.39 in). The larvae feed on Fagus crenata.
