= Darenth Wood =

Woodland in Kent, England

Coordinates: 51.426°N 0.267°E

- Site of Special Scientific Interest
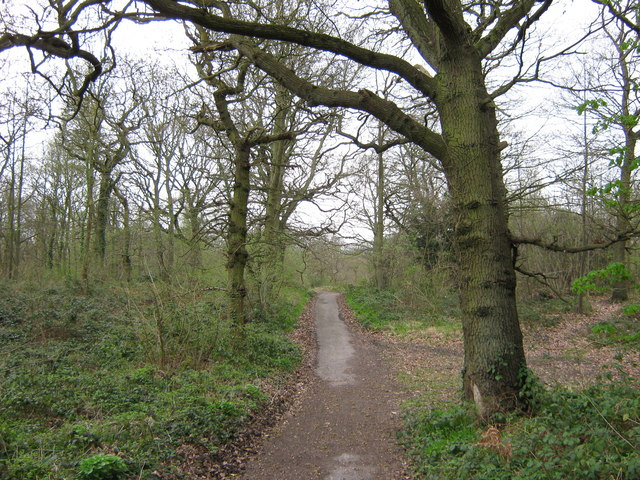
- Location of Darenth Wood.
- Area of search: Kent
- Grid reference: TQ 577 721
- Interest: Biological
- Area: 122.9 hectares (304 acres)
- Notification date: 1989
- Location map: Magic Map

Darenth Wood is a 122.9-hectare (304-acre) biological Site of Special Scientific Interest east of Dartford in Kent.

This ancient semi-natural wood has many rare invertebrates, including thirty-two which are nationally scarce and two which are nationally rare: these are beetles which live in dead and dying oak timber, Grilis pannonicus and Platypus cylindricus.

The wood is crossed by roads and footpaths.
