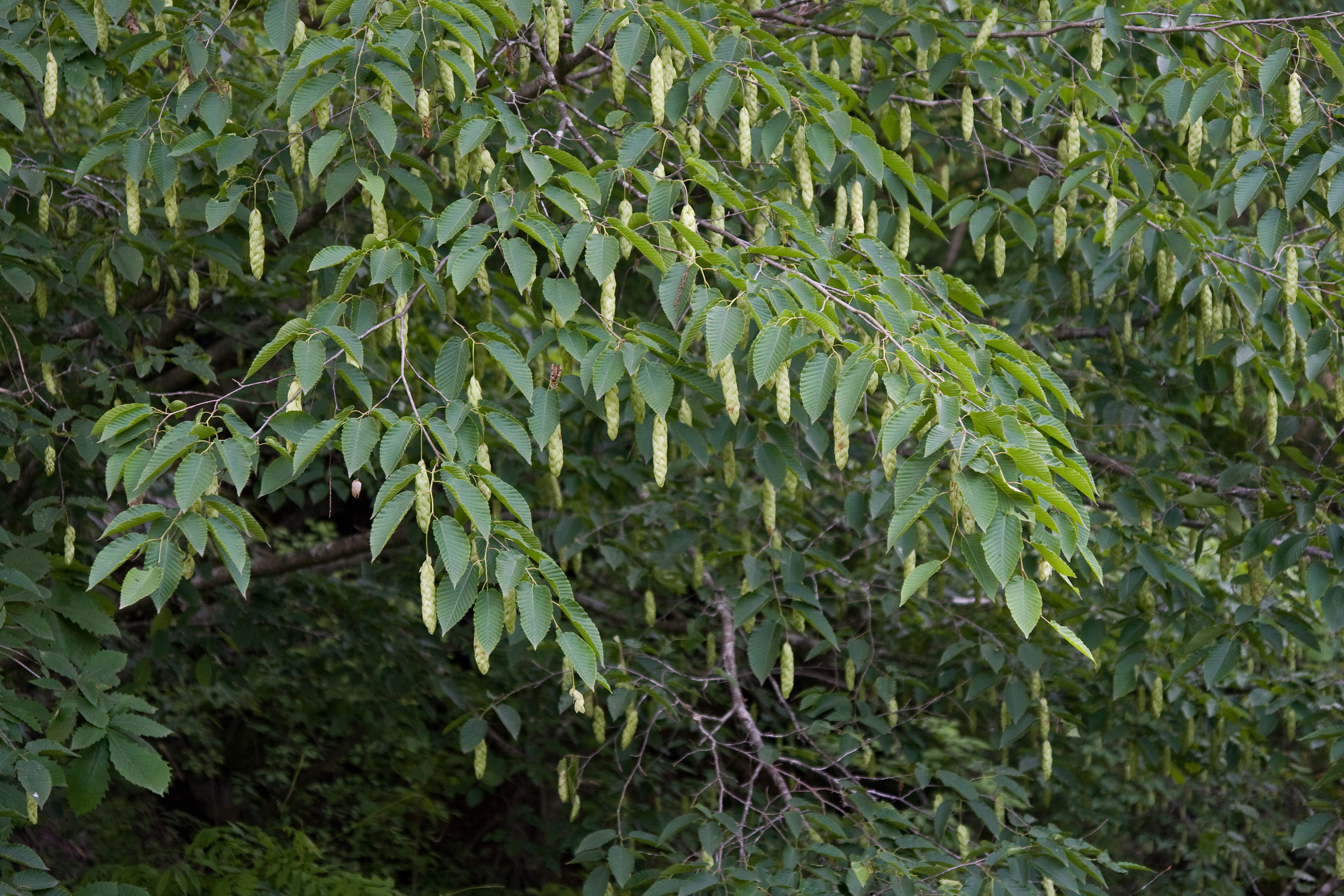

Conservation status
- Least Concern (IUCN 3.1)

Scientific classification
- Kingdom: Plantae
- Clade: Embryophytes
- Clade: Tracheophytes
- Clade: Angiosperms
- Clade: Eudicots
- Clade: Rosids
- Order: Fagales
- Family: Betulaceae
- Genus: Carpinus
- Species: C. cordata

Binomial name
- Carpinus cordata Blume

Varieties
- Carpinus cordata var. chinensis Franch.; Carpinus cordata var. cordata; Carpinus cordata var. mollis (Rehder) W.C.Cheng ex F.H.Chen

Synonyms
- Distegocarpus cordatus (Blume) A.DC.; synonyms of var. chinensis: Carpinus chinensis (Franch.) S.J.Pei; synonyms of var. cordata: Carpinus cordata var. brevistachyus S.L.Tung; Carpinus erosa Blume; Carpinus erosa var. microcarpa Hayashi; Carpinus erosa var. velutina Hayashi; Distegocarpus erosa (Blume) A.DC.; Ostrya mandshurica Budishchev; synonyms of var. mollis: Carpinus mollis Rehder

= Carpinus cordata =

Species of flowering plant

Carpinus cordata is a species of flowering plant belonging to the family Betulaceae. It is a shrub or tree native to China, Korea, Japan, and southwestern Primorsky Krai in the Russian Far East.

It is a densely branched shrub or small tree, usually 5-10 metres tall but occasionally to 15 m.

It grows in temperate forests on mountain slopes in deep, rich and moist soil up to 2,500 metres elevation. In China it is known from Anhui, Gansu, Guizhou, Hebei, Hubei, Hunan, Jiangsu, Jiangxi, Liaoning, southern Ningxia, Shaanxi, Shanxi, Shandong, Sichuan and Zhejiang provinces. In Japan it is known from the main islands of Hokkaido, Honshu, Kyushu, and Shikoku. In North Korea it is known from three mountains, Chonmasan at 290 m, Kumgansan at 160–560 m, and Myohyangsan at 320–1130 m.

Three varieties are accepted:

- Carpinus cordata var. chinensis Franch. – central and southern China and Japan
- Carpinus cordata var. cordata – northern and east-central China, Japan, Korea, and southwestern Primorsky Krai
- Carpinus cordata var. mollis (Rehder) W.C.Cheng ex F.H.Chen – Sichuan to Ningxia in central China

The species was described by Carl Ludwig Blume in 1851.
