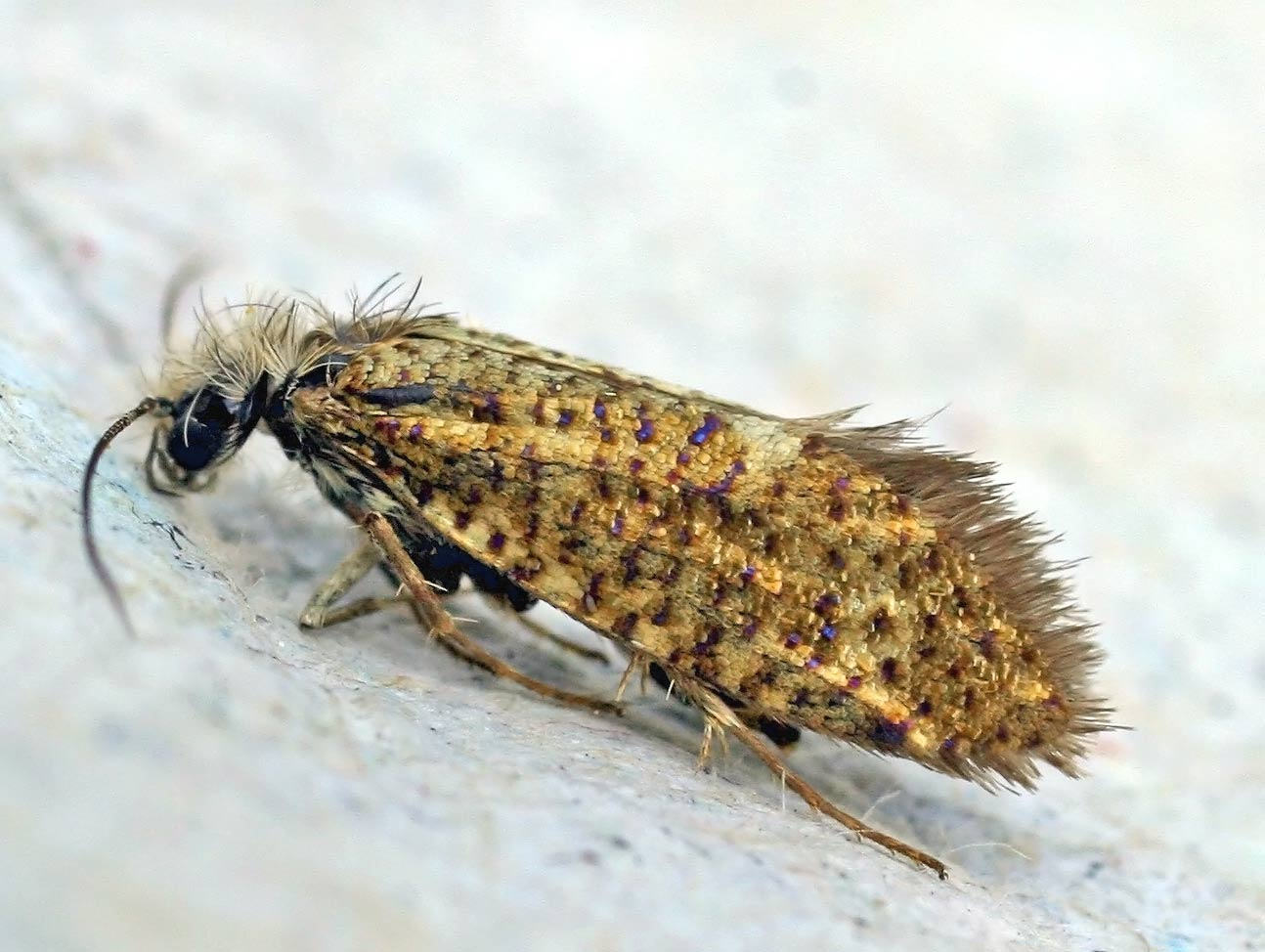
- Eriocrania semipurpurella

Scientific classification
- Kingdom: Animalia
- Phylum: Arthropoda
- Clade: Pancrustacea
- Class: Insecta
- Order: Lepidoptera
- Suborder: Glossata
- Infraorder: Dacnonypha; Hinton, 1946 sensu Minet, 2002
- Superfamily: Eriocranioidea
- Family: Eriocraniidae; Rebel, 1901

Genera
- Dyseriocrania; Eriocrania; Eriocraniella; Issikiocrania; Neocrania †Eriocranites Kernbach, 1967

Diversity
- 25 described species

= Eriocraniidae =

Family of moths

Eriocraniidae is a family of moths restricted to the Holarctic region, with six extant genera. These small, metallic moths are usually day-flying, emerging fairly early in the northern temperate spring. They have a proboscis with which they drink water or sap. The larvae are leaf miners on Fagales, principally the trees birch (Betula) and oak (Quercus), but a few on Salicales and Rosales.

== Characteristics ==
Moths in this family are diurnal, flying in the spring at dawn, and in sunshine, sometimes in swarms around host trees. They sometimes come to light and also rest on twigs and branches. By tapping branches over a beating tray, they fall and remain motionless. The moths are small with a forewing length of 4–7 mm. Forewings marking are shining pale golden or purple and often mottled. The purple moths can be difficult to tell apart with certainty and may require genitalia examination. The female moth has a piercing ovipositor and the almost colourless eggs are laid in the parenchyma of a leaf or in a leaf bud. The white or grey larvae form large blotches in the leaves containing intertwining strands of frass. Pupa are decticous in a tough, silken cocoon in the soil.

== Etymology ==
Eriocrania means woolly-headed, from the Greek, erion – wool and kranion – upper part of the head.
