= Chumash people =

Native American tribe of California

Chumash
- Historical Chumash villages

Total population
- 2,000–5,000

Regions with significant populations
- United States: ∟California

Languages
- English • Spanish • formerly Chumashan languages

Religion
- Indigenous religion, Christianity

Related ethnic groups
- Barbareño, Ventureño, Ineseño, Purisimeño, Obispeño

The Chumash are a Native American people of the central and southern coastal regions of California, in portions of what became Kern, San Luis Obispo, Santa Barbara, Ventura, and Los Angeles counties, extending from Morro Bay in the north to Malibu in the south to Mount Pinos in the east. Their territory includes three of the Channel Islands: Santa Cruz, Santa Rosa, and San Miguel; the smaller island of Anacapa was likely inhabited seasonally due to the lack of a consistent water source.

Modern place names with Chumash origins include Malibu, Nipomo, Lompoc, Ojai, Pismo Beach, Point Mugu, Port Hueneme, Piru, Lake Castaic, Saticoy, Simi Valley, and Somis. Archaeological research shows that the Chumash people have deep roots in the Santa Barbara Channel area and have lived along the southern California coast for millennia.

== History ==
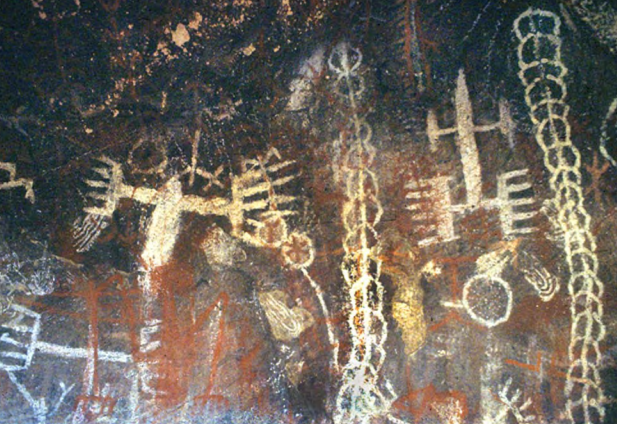
Chumash pictographs in Simi Valley dating to 500 AD.

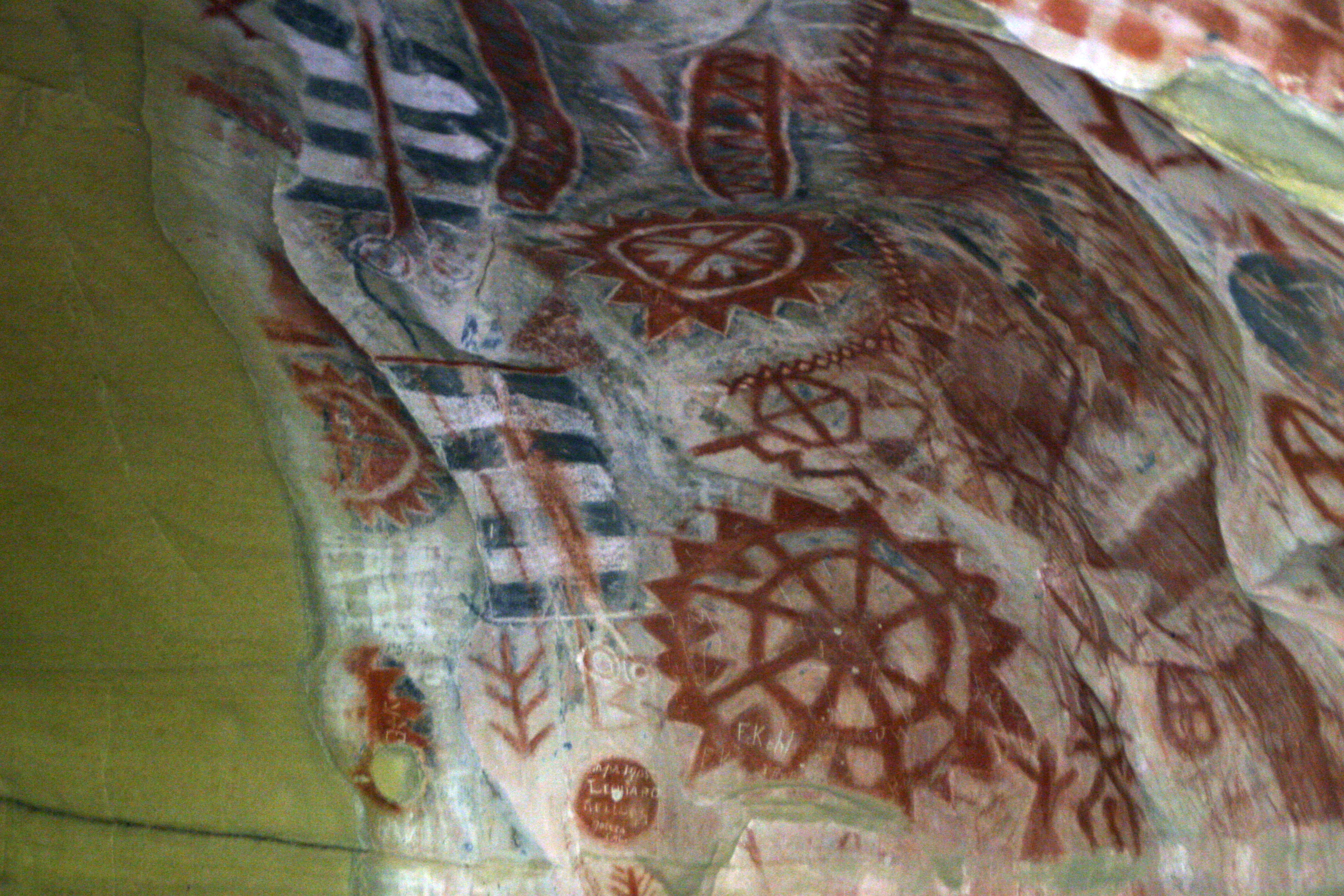
Pictographs, Chumash Painted Cave State Historic Park

=== Prior to European contact (pre-1542) ===
Indigenous peoples have lived along the California coast for at least 11,000 years. Sites of the Millingstone Horizon date from 7000 to 4500 BC and show evidence of a subsistence system focused on the processing of seeds with metates and manos.

During that time, people used bipointed bone objects and line to catch fish and began making beads from shells of the marine olive snail (Callianax biplicata). The name Chumash means "bead maker" or "seashell people" being that they originated near the Santa Barbara coast. The Chumash tribes near the coast benefited most with the "close juxtaposition of a variety of marine and terrestrial habitats, intensive upwelling in coastal waters, and intentional burning of the landscape made the Santa Barbara Channel region one of the most resource abundant places on the planet."

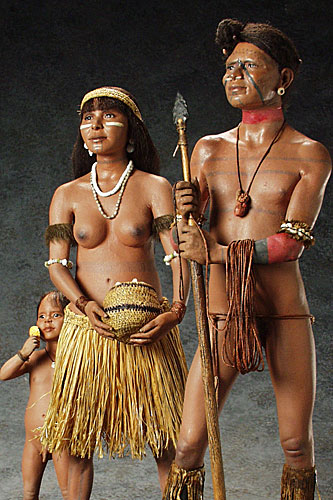
Chumash Family by American sculptor George S. Stuart

While droughts were not uncommon in the centuries of the first millennium AD, a population explosion occurred with the coming of the medieval warm period. "Marine productivity soared between 950 and 1300 as natural upwelling intensified off the coast." Before the mission period, the Chumash lived in over 150 independent villages, speaking variations of the same language. Much of their culture consisted of basketry, bead manufacturing and trading, cuisine of local abalone and clam, herbalism using local herbs to produce teas and medical reliefs, rock art, and the scorpion tree.

The scorpion tree was significant to the Chumash, as shown in its arborglyph: a carving depicting a six-legged creature with a headdress including a crown and two spheres. The shamans participated in the carving which was used in observations of the stars and in part of the Chumash calendar. The Chumash resided between the Santa Ynez Mountains and the California coasts where a bounty of resources could be found. The tribe lived in an area of three environments: the interior, the coast, and the Northern Channel Islands.

The interior is composed of the land outside the coast and spanning the wide plains, rivers, and mountains. The coast covers the cliffs, land close to the ocean, and the areas of the ocean from which the Chumash harvested. The Northern Channel Islands lie off the coast of the Chumash territory. All of the California coastal-interior has a Mediterranean climate due to the incoming ocean winds.

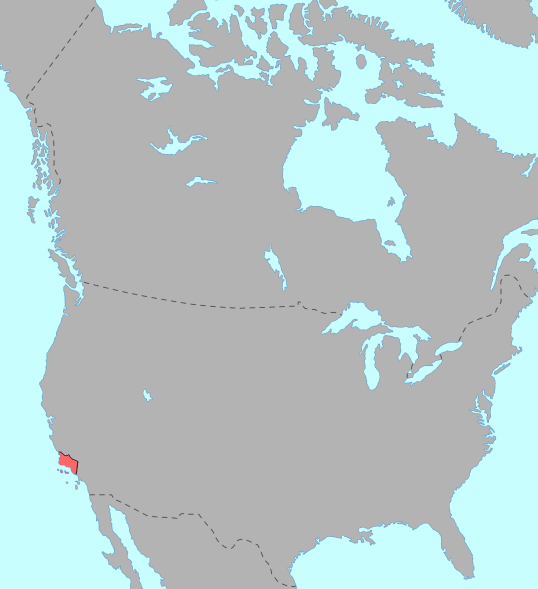
Precontact distribution of the Chumash

The mild temperatures, save for winter, made gathering easy; during the cold months, the Chumash harvested what they could and supplemented their diets with stored foods. What villagers gathered and traded during the seasons changed depending on where they resided. With coasts populated by masses of species of fish and land densely covered by trees and animals, the Chumash had a diverse array of food.

Abundant resources and a winter rarely harsh enough to cause concern meant the tribe lived a sedentary lifestyle in addition to a subsistence existence. Villages in the three aforementioned areas contained remains of sea mammals, indicating that trade networks existed for moving materials throughout the Chumash territory. The Chumash were connected to extensive trade networks reaching into modern-day Arizona, from which pottery and textiles were traded in exchange for shell beads. The emergence of this trade network within the Chumash territory was facilitated by the existence of three distinct Chumash ecological groups including the island, coastal, and mainland Chumash. Access to distinct resources for these different groups made inter-Chumash trade a large part of life. Villages along the mainland coast emerged as intermediaries between groups.

The closer a village was to the ocean, the greater its reliance on maritime resources. Due to advanced canoe designs, coastal and island people could procure fish and aquatic mammals from farther out. Shellfish were a good source of nutrition: relatively easy to find and abundant. Many of the favored varieties grew in tidal zones. Shellfish grew in abundance during winter to early spring; their proximity to shore made collection easier. Some of the consumed species included mussels, abalone, and a wide array of clams. Haliotis rufescens (red abalone) was harvested along the Central California coast in the pre-contact era. The Chumash and other California Indians also used red abalone shells to make a variety of fishhooks, beads, ornaments, and other artifacts. Large piles of shellfish waste were expanded over time to create ceremonial and residential mounds.

Ocean animals such as otters and seals were thought to be the primary meal of coastal tribes people, but recent evidence shows the aforementioned trade networks exchanged oceanic animals for terrestrial foods from the interior. Any village could acquire fish, but the coastal and island communities specialized in catching not just smaller fish, but also the massive catches such as swordfish. This feat, difficult even for today's technology, was made possible by the tomol plank canoe. Its design allowed for the capture of deepwater fish, and it facilitated trade routes between villages.

Some researchers believe that the Chumash may have been visited by Polynesians between AD 400 and 800, nearly 1,000 years before Christopher Columbus reached the Americas. The Chumash advanced sewn-plank canoe design, used throughout Polynesia but unknown in North America except by those two tribes, is cited as the chief evidence for contact. Comparative linguistics may provide evidence as the Chumash word for "sewn-plank canoe", tomolo'o, may have been derived from kumula'au, the Polynesian word for the redwood logs used in that construction. However, the language comparison is generally considered tentative. Furthermore, the development of the Chumash plank canoe is fairly well represented in the archaeological record and spans several centuries. The concept is rejected by most archaeologists who work with the Chumash culture, and there is no evidence of a genetic legacy.

Before contact with Europeans, coastal Chumash relied less on terrestrial resources than they did on maritime; vice versa for interior Chumash. Regardless, they consumed similar land resources. Like many other tribes, deer were the most important land mammal the Chumash pursued; deer were consumed in varying amounts across all regions, which cannot be said for other terrestrial animals. Interior Chumash placed greater value on the deer, to the extent of developing unique hunting practices for them.

They dressed as deer and grazed alongside the animals until the hunters were in range to use their arrows. Even Chumash close to the ocean pursued deer, though in fewer numbers. The villages also relied on smaller animals, such as rabbits and birds, to supplement their meat needs. Plant foods composed the rest of the Chumash diet, especially acorns, which were the staple food despite the work needed to remove their inherent toxins. They could be ground into a paste that was easy to eat and store for years. Coast live oak provided the best acorns; their mush would usually be served unseasoned with meat and fish.

=== Spanish/Mexican era (1542–1846) ===
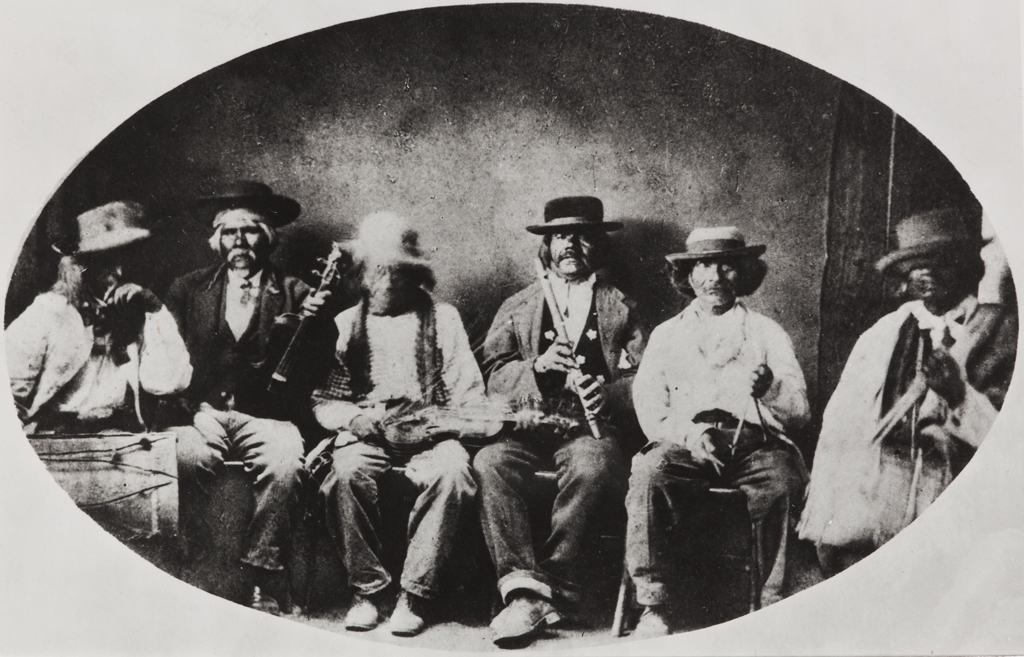
Chumash musicians at Mission San Buenaventura, 1873

The maritime explorer Juan Cabrillo was the first European to make contact with the coastal Alta Californian tribes in the year 1542. Cabrillo was killed following an attack by Tongva braves and was buried on San Miguel Island, but his men brought back a diary that contained the names and population counts for many Chumash villages, such as Mikiw. Spain claimed what is now California from that time forward, but for some centuries returned only infrequently—for example, during the Morro Bay Landing of 1587, when Chumash braves murdered one Spanish sailor and one Filipino sailor. Full-scale Spanish settlement began in 1769, when the Portolá expedition brought Spanish soldiers and missionaries with the double purpose of Christianizing the Native Americans and facilitating Spanish colonization. By the end of 1770, missions and military presidios had been founded at San Diego to the south of Chumash lands and Monterey to their north.

With the arrival of the Europeans "came a series of unprecedented blows to the Chumash and their traditional lifeways. Anthropologists, historians, and other scholars have long been interested in documenting the collision of cultures that accompanied the European exploration and colonization of the Americas." In 1770, Spain settled in Chumash territory. They founded colonies, bringing in missionaries to begin evangelizing Native Americans in the region by forcing Chumash villages into numerous missions that emerged along the coast.

The Chumash people moved from their villages to the Franciscan missions between 1772 and 1817. Mission San Luis Obispo, established in 1772, was the first mission in Chumash-speaking lands, as well as the northernmost of the five missions ever constructed in those lands. Next established, in 1782, was Mission San Buenaventura on the Pacific Coast near the mouth of the Santa Clara River. Mission Santa Barbara, also on the coast, and facing out to the Channel Islands, was established in 1786.

Mission La Purisima Concepción was founded along the inland route from Santa Barbara north to San Luis Obispo in 1789. The final Franciscan mission to be constructed in Chumash territory was Santa Ynez, founded in 1804 on the Santa Ynez River with a seed population of Chumash people from Missions La Purisima and Santa Barbara. To the southeast, Mission San Fernando, founded in 1798 in the land of Takic Shoshonean speakers, also took in large numbers of Chumash speakers from the middle Santa Clara River valley. While most of the Chumash people joined one mission or another between 1772 and 1806, a significant portion of the Native peoples of the Channel Islands did not move to the mainland missions until 1816. The Chumash Revolt of 1824, which began at Mission Santa Inés, was "one of the largest and most successful revolts of Native American Catholic neophytes in the Spanish West" and is therefore a major instance of Indigenous resistance to European colonization.

Radiocarbon dating of artifacts on the southernmost of the Channel Islands, San Clemente Island, suggests that the Chumash people lived without significant contact from Spanish settlers and missionaries until the 1870’s. This island shows a clear lack of Spanish influence on its archaeology up until this point. Because of its remoteness, it was perhaps the last Chumash area to be colonized.

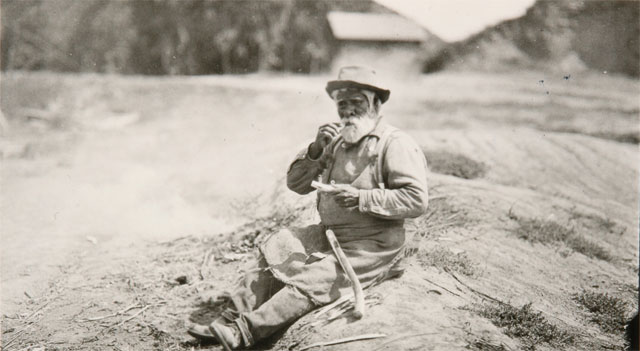
Fernando Librado was born in the Mexican era to two Chumash parents from Limuw.

Mexico achieved independence from Spain in 1821, but the mission system remained. Tribespeople continued to be relocated to missions, often forcibly, and many fled into the interior to avoid slavery in the mission system. The Mexican Secularization Act of 1833 seized control of the missions, and tribespeople still living at the missions were freed by 1840. Many, however, continued highly exploitative work on the large privately owned ranches created from the former mission-controlled lands.

=== American era (1846–present) ===
After the United States seized control of the area in 1846, in the Mexican-American War, most remaining Chumash land was lost to Americans amid a declining population, due to the effects of violence, disease, and anti-Indigene California laws.

The remaining Chumash began to lose their cohesive identity. In 1855, a small piece of land (120 acres) was set aside for just over 100 remaining Chumash Indians near Santa Ynez mission. This land ultimately became the only Chumash reservation, although Chumash individuals and families also continued to live throughout their former territory in southern California. Today, the Santa Ynez band lives at and near Santa Ynez. The Chumash population had been between roughly 10,000 and 18,000 in the late 18th century, but in 1990, only 213 Indians lived on the Santa Ynez Reservation.

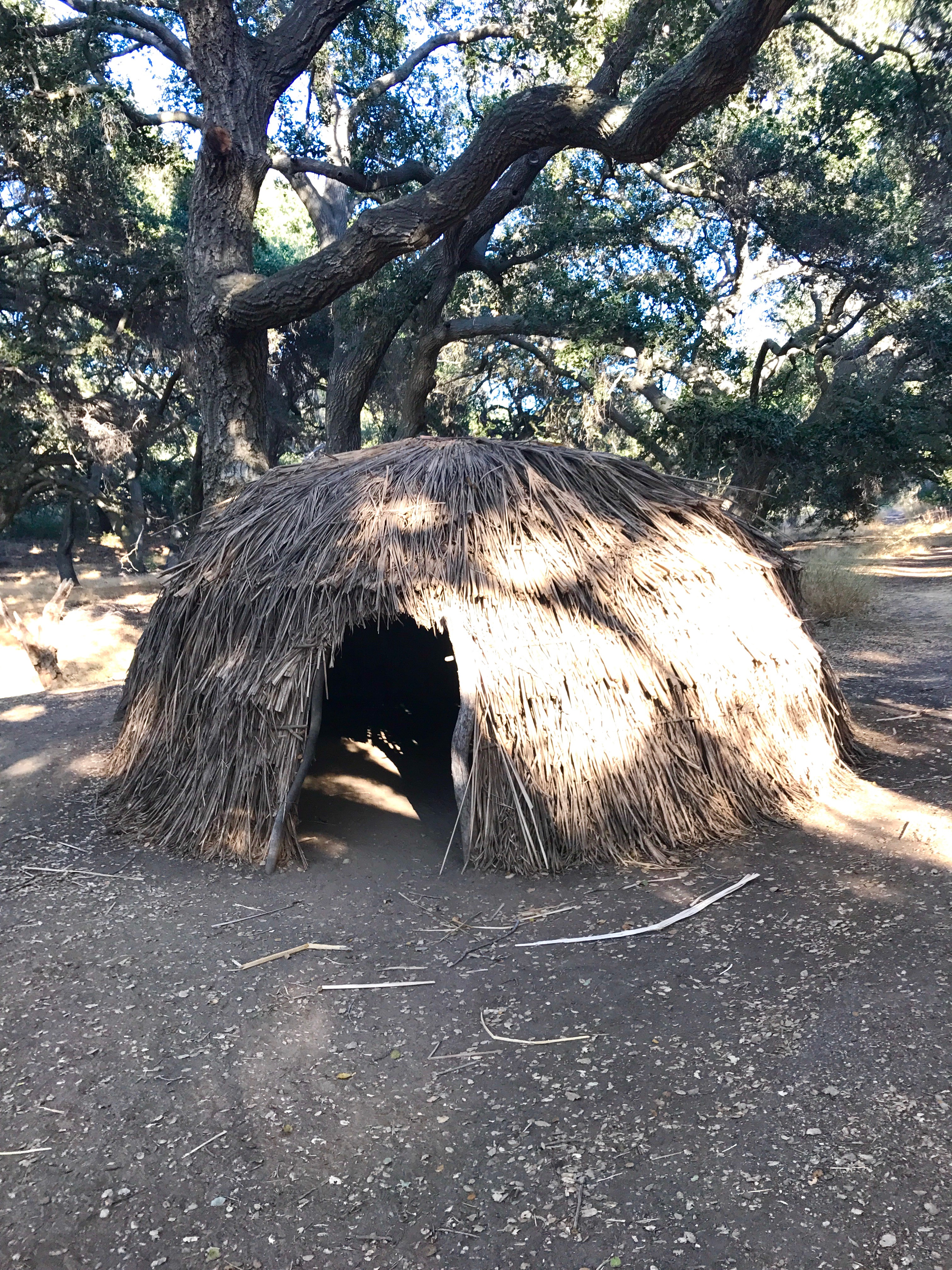
Reconstructed Chumash hut at the Chumash Indian Museum

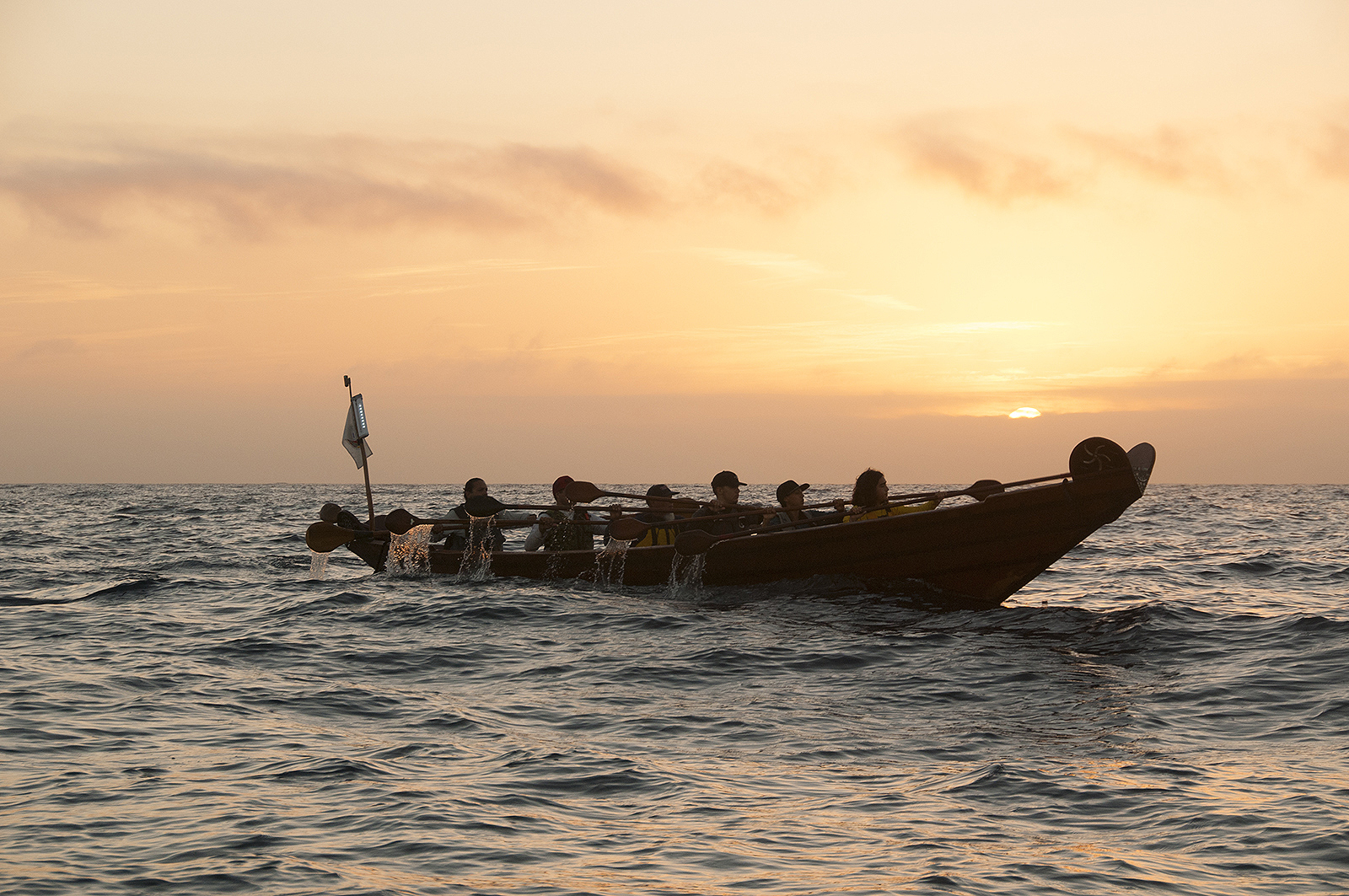
The Chumash revived their cultural tradition of traveling via tomol from the California coast to the Channel Islands.

The Chumash reservation, established in 1901, encompasses 127 acres. No Chumash fluently speak their own language since Mary Yee, the last Barbareño speaker, died in 1965. Today, an estimated 5,000 people are Chumash. Many current Chumash can trace their ancestors to the five islands of Channel Islands National Park.

Beginning in the late 1960s and early 1970s, efforts were made to reawaken Chumash tradition and community practices by notable community members throughout the Chumash Nation. They promoted traditions of the Chumash, and are recognized by many local governments and universities, but their assertion of Chumash identity has been criticized by others, primarily non-Native anthropologists who base most of their research on records kept by the Mission system, which were often inaccurate, and do not account for the Indigenous people who lived outside of slavery. According to SUNY anthropologist Brian D. Haley, modern-day heritage groups who may be referred to as “Chumash” include the Quabajai Chumash Association, Brotherhood of the Tomol, and the Coastal Band of the Chumash Nation. According to Haley, the Chumash identity asserted by Neo-Chumash is generally rejected by members of the established Santa Ynez, Barbareño, Ventureño, and San Luis Obispo Chumash bands.

The first modern tomol was built and launched in 1976 as a result of the efforts of the Quabajai Chumash of the Coastal Band of the Chumash Nation. Its name is Helek/Xelex, the Chumash word for hawk. The Brotherhood of the Tomol was revived and her crew paddled and circumnavigated around the Santa Barbara Channel Islands on a 10-day journey, stopping on three of the islands. The second tomol, the Elye'wun ("swordfish"), was launched in 1997.

On September 9, 2001, the first "crossing" in the Chumash tomol, from the mainland to the Channel Islands, was sponsored by the Chumash Maritime Association and the Barbareño Chumash Council. Many Chumash people from a variety of tribal bands gathered on the island of Limuw (the Chumash name for Santa Cruz Island) to witness the Elye'wun being paddled from the mainland to Santa Cruz Island. Their journey was documented in the short film "Return to Limuw" produced by the Ocean Channel for the Chumash Maritime Association, Channel Islands National Marine Sanctuary, and the Santa Barbara Maritime Museum. The channel crossings have become a yearly event hosted collaboratively by members of various Chumash bands. The Santa Ynez Band of Chumash is a federally recognized Chumash tribe. They have the Santa Ynez Reservation located in Santa Barbara County, near Santa Ynez. Chumash people are also enrolled in the Tejon Indian Tribe of California.

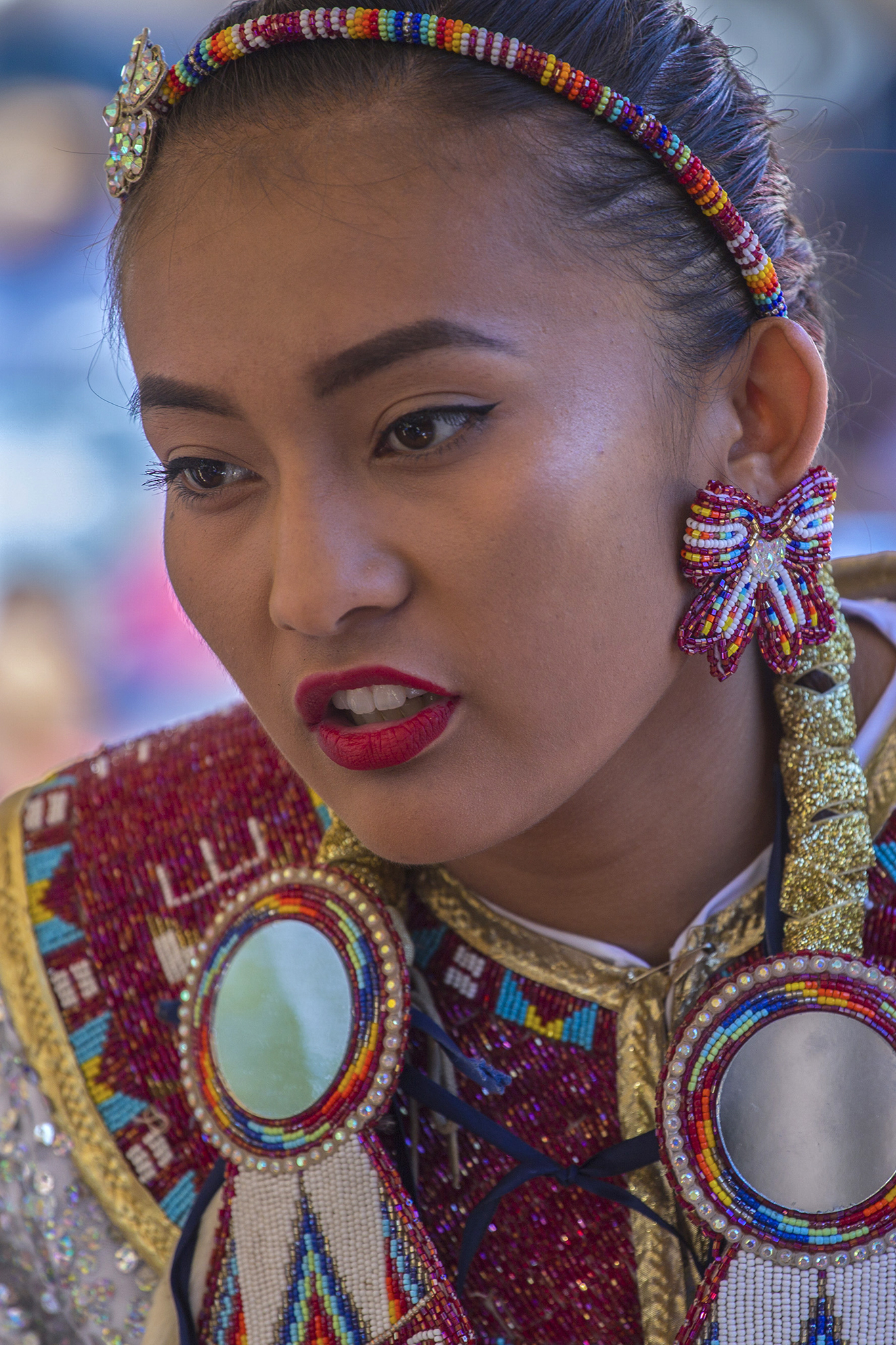
Chumash dancer

In addition to the Santa Ynez Band, the Coastal Band of the Chumash Nation and the Barbareño/Ventureño Band of Mission Indians are attempting to gain federal recognition. Other Chumash tribal groups include the Northern Chumash Tribal Council, from the San Luis Obispo area, and the Barbareño Chumash Council, from the greater Santa Barbara area. The publication of the first Chumash dictionary took place in April 2008. Six hundred pages long and containing 4,000 entries, the Samala-English Dictionary includes more than 2,000 illustrations. The documentary film 6 Generations: A Chumash Family History features Mary Yee, the last speaker of the Barbareño Chumash language.

==== Produce initiative ====
In December 2010, the Foodbank of Santa Barbara County was the recipient of a $10,000 grant from the Santa Ynez Band of Chumash Indians Foundation to support expansion of the Produce Initiative. The Produce Initiative puts an emphasis on supplying fruits and vegetables to 264 local nonprofits and food programs. The foodbank distributes produce free of charge to member agencies to encourage healthy eating. Expanding produce accessibility to children is important to the foodbank and the newly operating Kids’ Farmers' Market program, an extension of the Produce Initiative, achieves that goal.

The program trains volunteers to teach kids in after-school programs nutrition education and hands-on cooking instructions. This program currently operates at 12 sites countywide, including in the Santa Ynez Valley. After the children cook and eat a healthy meal, they get to take home a bag full of fresh produce, where they can help feed and cook for the whole family. Obesity in children is a major health problem prevalent among Native Americans.

To promote sustainable agriculture and healthy diets, the Santa Ynez Band of Chumash Environmental Office and Education Departments' after-school program planted a community garden, which provided vegetables to the Elder's Council, beginning in 2013. The Santa Ynez Valley Fruit and Vegetable Rescue, also known as Veggie Rescue, is another effort to improve food sourcing for the Santa Ynez.

== Worldviews and cosmology ==
Chumash worldview is centered on the belief "that considers all things to be, in varying measure, alive, intelligent, dangerous, and sacred." According to Thomas Blackburn in December's Child: A Book of Chumash Oral Narratives published in 1980, the Chumash do not have a creation story like Tongva, Acjachemen, Quechnajuichom, and other Takic-speaking peoples. Rather, as summarized by Susan Suntree, "they assume that the universe with its three, or in some versions five, layers has always been here.

Human beings occupy the Middle Region, which rests upon two giant snakes. Chronological time is unimportant, though the past is divided into two sections: the universal flood that caused the First People to become the natural world and, thereafter the creation of human beings, the arrival of the Europeans, and the devastating consequences that followed."

The middle region (sometimes referred to as 'antap), where humans and spirits of this world live and where shamans could travel in vision quests, is interconnected with the lower world (C'oyinahsup) through the springs and marsh areas and is connected to the upper world through the mountains. In the lower world live snakes, frogs, salamanders. The world trembles or has earthquakes when the snakes which support the world writhe.

Water creatures are also in contact with the powers of the lower world and "were often depicted in rock art perhaps to bring more water to the Chumash or to appease underworld spirits' at times of hunger or disease." Itiashap is the home of the First People. Alapay is the upper world in Chumash cosmology where the "sky people" lived, who play an important role in the health of the people. Principle figures of the sky world include the Sun, the Moon, Lizard, Sky Coyote, and Eagle. The Sun is the source of life and is also "a source of disease and death." The Sky Coyote, also known as the Great Coyote of the Sky or Shnilemun, is considered to be a protector and according to Inseño Chumash lore, "looks out for the welfare of all in the world below him". During the creation of mankind, the Sky Coyote was present among the other important cosmological figures. According to John M. Anderson in his work Chumash Demonology, the Eagle, also known as Slo’w, represents the ruler of Polaris. The Eagle also is the force that maintains momentum and order among the other stars so that they do not fall down on and destroy earth.

=== Cosmology and astronomy ===
The Chumash cosmology is also centered around astronomy. Rock art and arborglyphs that have been found within Chumash sites are thought to have depicted Polaris (the North Star) and Ursa Major (the Big Dipper). Specialists Rex Saint-Onge, John R. Johnson, and Joseph R. Talaugon argue in their article Archaeoastronomical Implications of a Northern Chumash Arborglyph that these two astrological entities were paramount to the Chumash belief system as well as their perception of time. It is believed that the Chumash used these constellations to determine what time of the year it was, depending on the position of Ursa Major around Polaris.

== Chumash bands ==
One Chumash band, the Santa Ynez Band of Chumash Mission Indians of the Santa Ynez Reservation is a federally recognized tribe, and other Chumash people are enrolled in the federally recognized Tejon Indian Tribe. There are 14 bands of Chumash Indians.

- Barbareño Chumash, affiliated with the Taynayan missions and the Kashwa reservations.
- Coastal Band of the Chumash Nation, their historical territory, north of Los Angeles, includes parts of the coastal counties of Santa Barbara, San Luis Obispo, Kern, and Ventura. The Coastal band of the Chumash Nation applied for recognition in 1981.
- Cuyama Chumash, from the Cuyama Valley.
- Island Chumash, from the Channel Islands.
- Kagismuwas Chumash, from the southwesternmost region of the ancestral Chumash land. Their historical lands are now part of Vandenberg Space Force Base.
- Los Angeles Chumash, formed when members of the historic Malibu, Tejon, and Ventura bands were relocated in the 19th century.
- Malibu Chumash, from the coast of Malibu. Descendants of this band can now be found among the Ventura, Coastal, Tejon, and San Fernando Valley bands.
- Monterey Chumash, from the Monterey Peninsula.
- Samala, or Santa Ynez Chumash. The Santa Ynez Chumash people in 2012 went to federal court to regain more land. The Bureau of Indian Affairs approved the request; the land was to go toward tribal housing and a Chumash Museum and Cultural Center. Protesters and anti-tribal groups have spent approximately $2 million to disrupt or stop the land acquisition.
- San Fernando Valley Chumash, once laborers at the Mission San Fernando Rey de España. They intermarried other tribes who also worked at the mission.
- Yak Tityu Tityu Yak Tilhini Northern Chumash, homelands from coastal Avila Beach to Morro Bay. They are the northwesternmost Chumash people, located in San Luis Obispo County.
- Tecuya Chumash, most of this band of Chumash tribe were probably Kagismuwas. This band was established as an anti-colonial group, who took residence in the Tecuya Canyon along with the Tejon Chumash.
- Tejon Chumash, part of the Kern County Chumash Council. Tejon is the Spanish word for "badger", and its name was given to the Tejon Rancheria.
- Ventura Chumash, lives in the traditional Chumash domain of the Owl Clan.

== Population ==
Estimates for the precontact populations of most Native groups in California have varied substantially. The anthropologist Alfred L. Kroeber thought the 1770 population of the Chumash might have been about 10,000. Alan K. Brown concluded that the population was about 15,000. Sherburne F. Cook, at various times, estimated the aboriginal Chumash as 8,000, 13,650, 20,400, or 18,500.

Some scholars have suggested the Chumash population may have declined substantially during a "protohistoric" period (1542–1769), when intermittent contacts with the crews of Spanish ships, including those of Juan Rodriguez Cabrillo's expedition, who wintered in the Santa Barbara Channel in AD 1542–43, brought disease and death.

The Chumash appear to have been thriving in the late 18th century, when Spaniards first began actively colonizing the California coast. Whether the deaths began earlier with the contacts with ships' crews or later with the construction of several Spanish missions at Ventura, Santa Barbara, Lompoc, Santa Ynez, and San Luis Obispo, the Chumash were eventually devastated by the California Genocide carried out when the United States took over the territory. By 1900, their numbers had declined to just 200, while current estimates of Chumash people today range from 2,000 to 5,000.

The demographics of traditional Chumash society are quite complex. One aspect of interest is the 'Aqi gender of the Chumash. 'Aqi was a third Chumash gender defined by biological males that performed work and wore clothing traditionally of women. The 'aqi gender appears to also be closely tied to non-procreative sexual activity, such as homosexuality. Archaeological investigation of morturary practices has provided evidence for this.

== Languages ==
Several related languages under the name "Chumash" (from čʰumaš /t͡ʃʰumaʃ/, meaning "Santa Cruz Islander") were spoken. No native speakers remain, although the dialects are well documented in the unpublished fieldnotes of linguist John Peabody Harrington. Especially well documented are the Barbareño, Ineseño, Ventureño and Obispeño languages within the Chumashan language family, which is a language isolate. In 2010, the Šmuwič Chumash Language School was established at Wishtoyo's Chumash Village and remained active until 2012. The language reclamation program in 2010 was initially run by Elder Johnny Moreno and his niece Deborah Sanchez. The language classes were revitalized in 2014 at American Indian Health and Services in Santa Barbara and in Santa Paula in 2016. Sanchez was the sole instructor. Classes then moved online once the COVID pandemic arrived. The traditional name for Ineseño is s'amala /sʔamala/ and the Chumash name for the Barbareño people is Šmuwič.

== Culture ==
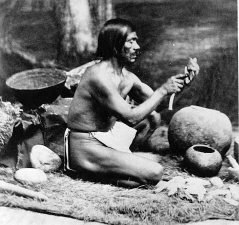
Rafael Solares, a Samala chief, captain of Soxtonoxmu, capital village in the Santa Ynez Valley, photograph by Leon de Cessac, late 19th century

The Chumash were hunter-gatherers and were adept at fishing at the time of Spanish colonization. They are one of the relatively few New World peoples who regularly navigated the ocean (another was the Tongva, a neighboring tribe to the south). Some settlements built a plank boat (tomol), which facilitated the distribution of goods and could be used for whaling.

=== Basketry ===
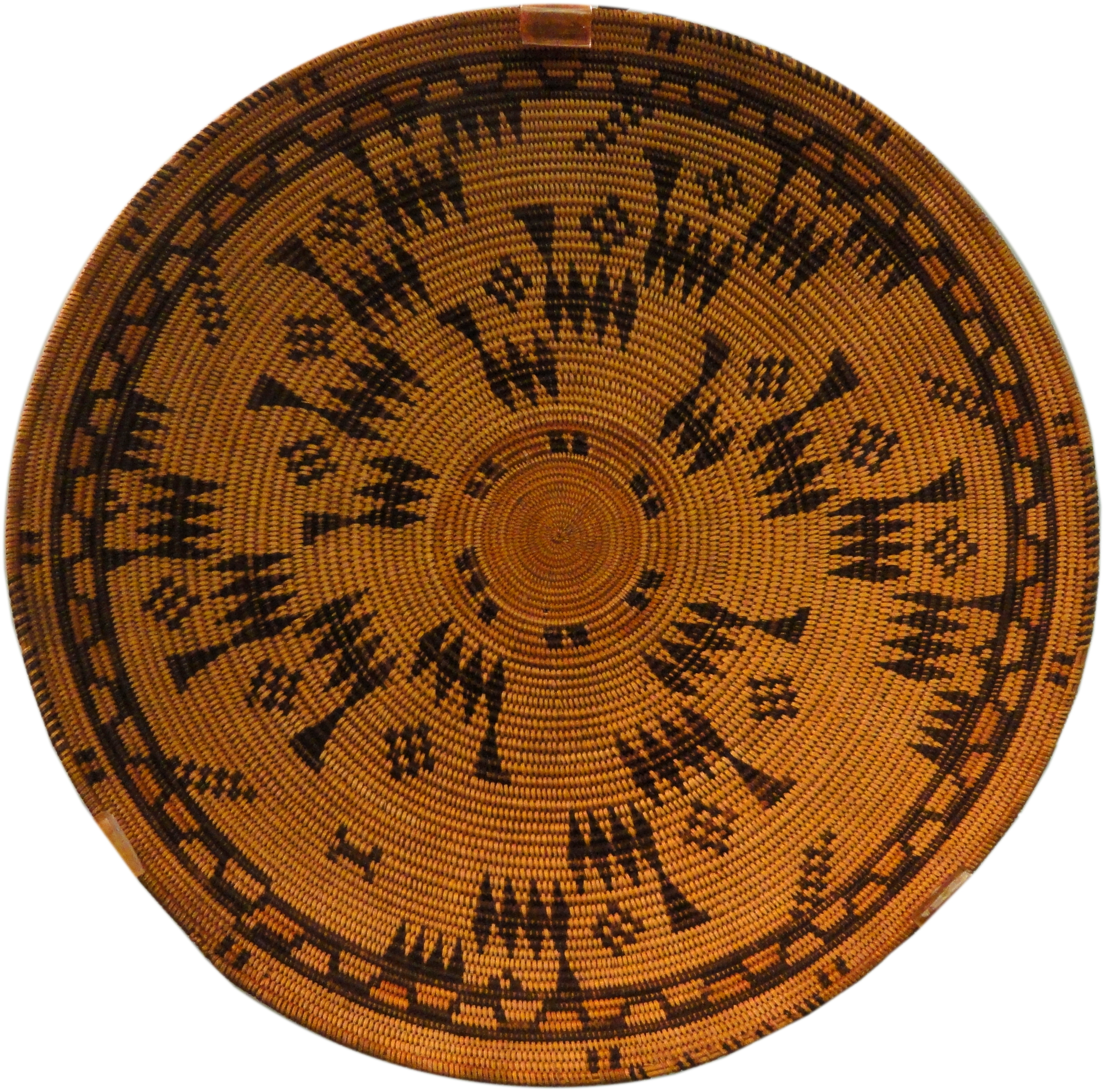
Coiled Basket tray, Santa Barbara Mission, early 19th century

Anthropologists have long collected Chumash baskets. Two of the largest collections are at the Smithsonian Institution in Washington, DC, and the Musée de l'Homme (Museum of Mankind) in Paris. The Santa Barbara Museum of Natural History is believed to have the largest collection of Chumash baskets.

=== Bead manufacture and trading ===
The Chumash of the Northern Channel Islands were at the center of an intense regional trade network. Beads made from Callianax shells were manufactured on the Channel Islands and used as a form of currency by the Chumash. Shell beads were not just a form of currency, they also played a vital role in the Chumash social system. The beads exchanges helped people build social networks, and accumulated wealth outside of food resources. This allowed the Chumash people to minimize the risk of food shortages in their tribe and were able to fall back on durable beads and their existing friends in other communities. Chumash chiefs and elite members were responsible with the redistribution of the shell beads, subsistence goods, and other items.

These shell beads were traded to neighboring groups and have been found throughout Alta California. Some items that were traded by the Chumash from the island to the Chumash mainland tribes included shell beads, digging stick weights (stone rings), and steatite Lolas (stone bowl) which originates mainly from Santa Catalina Island. The mainland tribes would in return export seeds, acorns, bows and arrows, fur, skin, roots, and baskets to the island. There was also trade from the mainland and inland areas whose items consisted of fish and beads. The interior citizens would trade fish, game, seeds, fruit, and fox-skin shawls to the coast. Fernando Librado (Chumash Elder) mentions that all the trade transactions took place on the mainland due to the location since it was between the island and the interior.

Over the course of late prehistory, millions of shell beads were manufactured and traded from Santa Cruz Island. It has been suggested that exclusive control over stone quarries used to manufacture the drills needed in bead production could have played a role in the development of social complexity in Chumash society.

The bead-making industry involved two distinct craft specializations: the production of tools used to make beads and the actual manufacturing of the beads themselves. Central to this industry was chert, a hard, fine-grained sedimentary rock. The Chumash crafted small flakes of chert into microblades, which were essential for their bead production. These microblades were then used to create drills, the tools necessary for making holes in shells, transforming them into beads. Thus, chert microlithic tools played a crucial role in the bead-making process.

The regional diversity present within the Chumash territory spawned an intricate trade system connecting the island, coastal, and mainland groups. The villages of Xaxas and Muwu emerged as the most important trade hubs for the Chumash people. Their positioning relative to coastal and mainland trade routes and resources made these villages particularly powerful within the Chumash trade ecosystem.

=== Cuisine, foodways, and subsistence ===
Foods historically consumed by the Chumash include several marine species, such as black abalone, the Pacific littleneck clam, red abalone, the bent-nosed clam, ostrea lurida oysters, angular unicorn snails, and the butternut clam. Acorns, an important plant food, were ground up and cooked into a soup. They also made flour from the dried fruits of the laurel sumac. Highly prized seafood such as swordfish were caught through the use of plank canoes and were likely shared by chiefs during communal feasts.

Feasts are a ritual activity of communal consumption of large quantities of food and drinks along with dances, music, and singing. They played a large role in political and social relations for the Chumash people. The feasts would be prepared over many days, mostly by women, and would coincide with major events such as childbirth, marriages, and chiefs’ birthdays. There are accounts of feasts being held for European expeditions passing through Chumash territories.

During the time of Spanish colonialism, some diets of the Chumash people living on mission sites shifted to include European plants and animals. Evidence has been found that more sheep and cattle were consumed during the 19th century. Traditional hunting and fishing practices were still maintained alongside the addition of European livestock.

There is evidence to suggest that a seafaring, fishing economy in the Channel Islands has been around for at least 12,000 years. This can be seen through various types of fishing projectile points as well as animal remains such as seal, shellfish, and fish all found at sites across the islands by archaeologists and researchers. Coastal people of California have been maintaining their food practices in various ways for a very long time.

=== Herbalism ===
Herbs used in traditional Chumash medicine include thick-leaved yerba santa, used to keep airways open for proper breathing; laurel sumac, the root bark of which was used to make a herbal tea for treating dysentery; and black sage, the leaves and stems were made into a strong sun tea. This was rubbed on the painful area or used to soak one's feet. The plant contains diterpenoids, such as aethiopinone and ursolic acid, which are known pain relievers.

The Chumash formerly practiced an initiation rite involving the use of sacred datura (mo'moy in their language). When a boy was 8 years old, his mother would give him a preparation of it to drink. This was supposed to be a spiritual challenge to help him develop the spiritual well-being required to become a man. Not all of the boys survived the poison.

=== Rock art ===
Chumash petroglyphs at Chumash Painted Cave State Historic Park

Remains of a developed Chumash culture, including rock paintings apparently depicting the Chumash cosmology, such as Chumash Painted Cave State Historic Park, can still be seen.

=== Scorpion tree ===
A centuries-old oak tree in California is considered to have a Chumash arborglyph, a carving of a six-legged creature with a headdress including a crown and two spheres. Previously thought to have been carved by cowboys, it was visited in 2007 by paleontologist Rex Saint Onge, who identified the three-foot carving as being of Chumash origin and related to other Chumash cave paintings in California. Further studies have led Saint Onge to believe these are not simply the work of Chumash, but by Chumash shamans who were conscious observers of the stars, and used these carvings to calibrate the Chumash calendar.

=== Mound Building ===
Mounds constructed by the ancient Chumash are found throughout Santa Barbara County. Small middens comprised mostly of California Mussel and red abalone are found throughout the area, but some grew large enough that they were expanded with fill and used for burials, housing and ceremonial purposes. The largest of these, El Montón on Santa Cruz island, was constructed between 6,000 and 2,500 BCE and grew to an area of over 44,000 square metres (11 acres) and a height of 8 metres (26 ft). Excavations at the site revealed over 50 houses, a sweat lodge and cemetery with hundreds of burials. Most other mounds were damaged by relic hunters before detailed archeological excavations could be conducted.

== Notable historical Chumash ==
This is a list of notable historical Chumash people. Contemporary Chumash people are listed on their tribe's articles.

- Rafael Solares (1822–1890), a Samala chief, captain of Soxtonoxmu, capital village in the Santa Ynez Valley who shared cultural knowledge with anthropologists in the 1800s
- Maria Solares (1842–1923), worked with John P. Harrington to help preserve the Chumash language and culture.
- Fernando Librado (1839–1915), elder, master tomol builder, craft specialist, philosopher, and storyteller.
- Mary Joachina Yee (1897–1965), linguist and last known speaker of the Barbareño language
- Rosario Cooper (October 7, 1845 - June 15, 1917), last known fluent speaker of the tiłhini language who shared cultural and linguistic information with linguist and ethnographer John P. Harrington.
- Petra Pico (c. April 29, 1834 – September 7, 1902), a skilled basket weaver and previous figurehead of the Ventureño Chumash Community.

== Places of significance ==
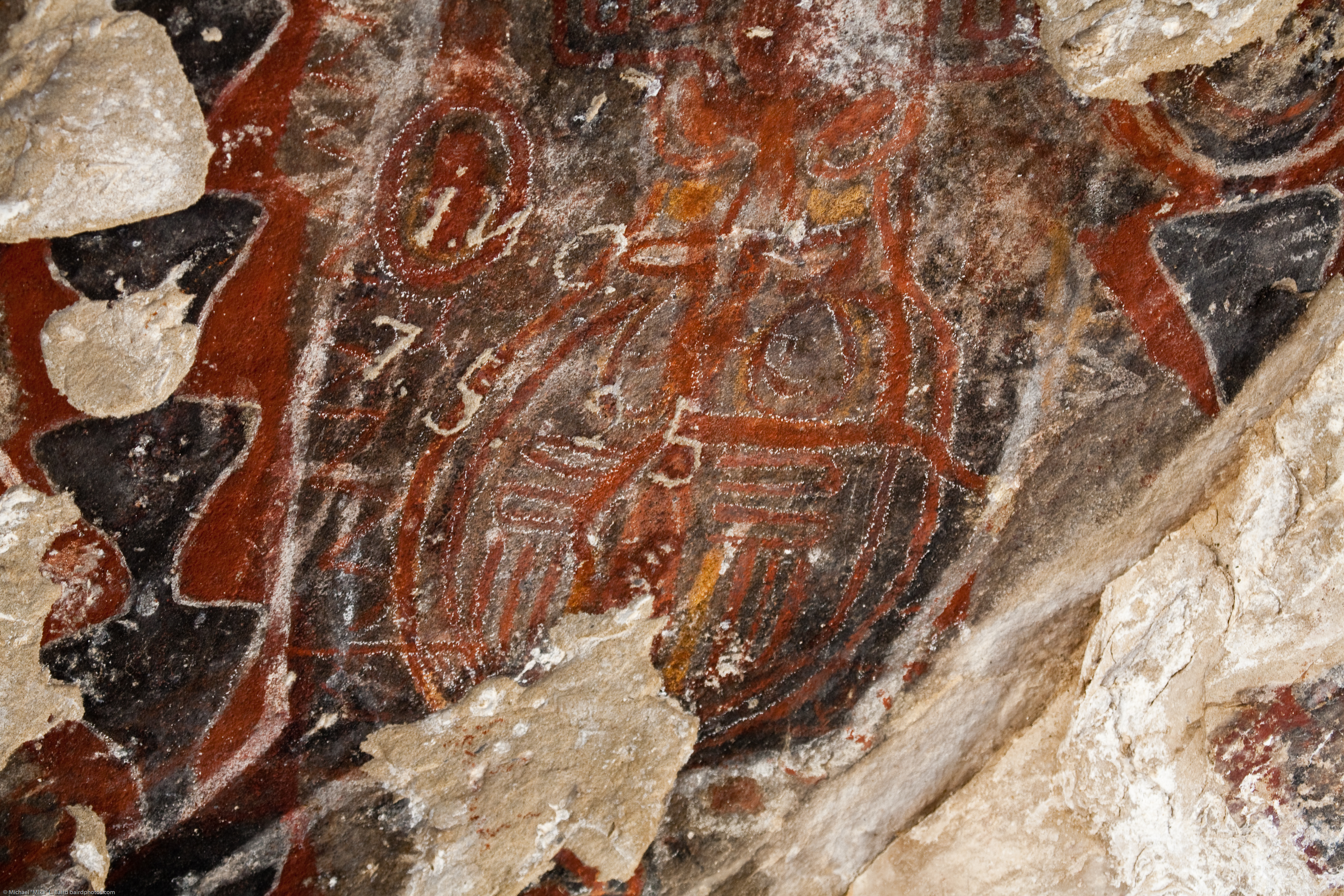
Pictographs at Painted Rock in the Carrizo Plain National Monument

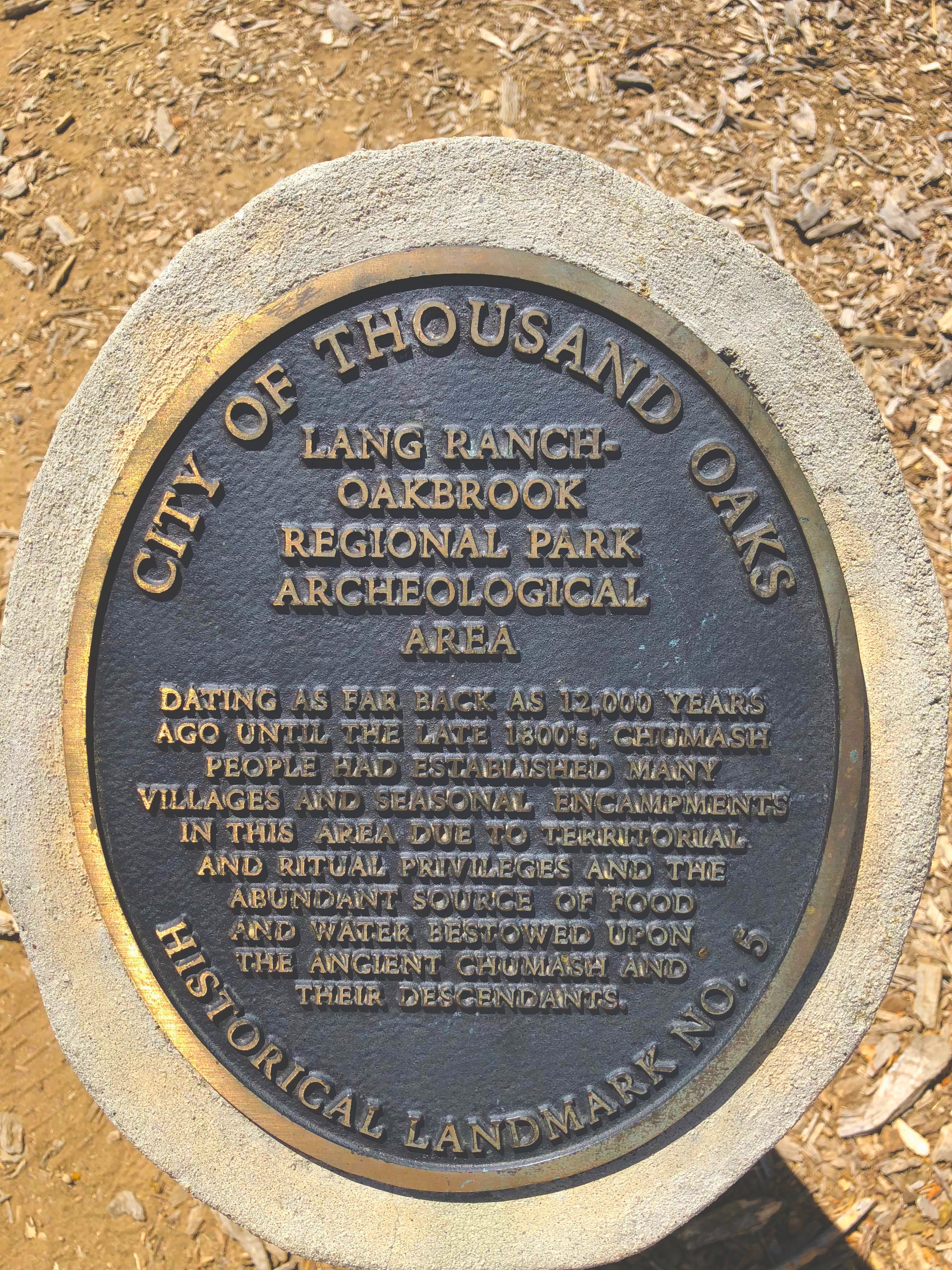
Chumash Indian Museum in Thousand Oaks

Places of significant archaeological and historical value.

- Albinger Archaeological Museum in Ventura – Chumash artifacts and history
- Burro Flats Painted Cave in Simi Valley – Chumash pictographs
- Carpinteria State Beach in Carpinteria – cave paintings depicting Chumash life
- Carpinteria Valley Museum of History and Historical Society in Carpinteria – Chumash artifacts and history
- Chumash Indian Museum in Thousand Oaks – exhibitions of artifacts and recreation of Chumash houses
- Chumash Painted Cave State Historic Park in Santa Barbara – cave paintings
- Hollister Adobe Museum in San Luis Obispo – Chumash artifacts and exhibits
- Iwihinmu (Mount Pinos) – place of Chumash cultural significance
- La Purísima Mission State Historic Park in Lompoc – displays of mission life in reconstructed buildings
- Lompoc Museum in Lompoc – Chumash artifacts and history
- Los Angeles County Museum of Natural History in Los Angeles – anthropology and guided tours for Chumash natural history
- Mission San Luis Obispo Museum – Chumash artifacts and exhibits
- Morro Bay Museum of Natural History – docent presentations and Chumash exhibits
- Museum of Ventura County – exhibits on Chumash history
- Ojai Valley Museum and Historical Society in Ojai. Inland Chumash history.
- Painted Rock, Carrizo Plain Natural Heritage Reserve in San Luis Obispo County – cave paintings
- Port Hueneme Historical Society Museum in Port Hueneme - Chumash speakers (Distinguished Speaker Series) exhibit on Chumash history and artifacts
- San Buenaventura Mission Museum in Ventura – exhibits on Chumash history
- San Luis Obispo County Historical Museum – Chumash artifacts and exhibits.
- Santa Barbara Historical Society in Santa Barbara. Guided tours.
- Santa Barbara Mission in Santa Barbara. Local Chumash history and guided tours.
- Santa Barbara Mission Archive-Library. Records of all California mission Indians. < https://web.archive.org/web/20191127055954/https://www.sbmal.org/>
- Santa Barbara Museum of Natural History – exhibits on Chumash Indians and natural history of Native Americans
- Santa Barbara Presidio – historical exhibits
- Santa Cruz Island – cave paintings in Olsen's Cave: More than 300,000 Chumash objects have been collected in the Channel Islands, which was home to 10 villages and more than 1200 Chumash residents.
- San Luis Obispo County Historical Museum – Chumash artifacts and exhibits
- Mission Santa Inés in Solvang – site of an early Spanish mission
- Santa Maria Valley Historical Society Museum – Chumash artifacts and exhibits
- Santa Rosa Island – cave paintings in Jones Cave. Thousands of artifacts of the island, which has been populated by the Chumash for more than 13,000 years, have been found.
- Santa Ynez Indian Reservation (Samala) – the only Chumash Indian reservation
- Satwiwa – ancient Chumash village and now museum in Newbury Park, CA
- Southwest Museum in Highland Park
- Shalawa Meadow – a former Chumash burial ground
- Toshololo (Frazier Mountain) – place of Chumash cultural significance

== See also ==
- Burro Flats Painted Cave
- Chumash Painted Cave State Historic Park, California
- Chumash traditional narratives
- Polynesian navigation
- Pre-Columbian trans-oceanic contact
- Shalawa Meadow, California
