= Frazier Mountain =

Mountain in California, United States

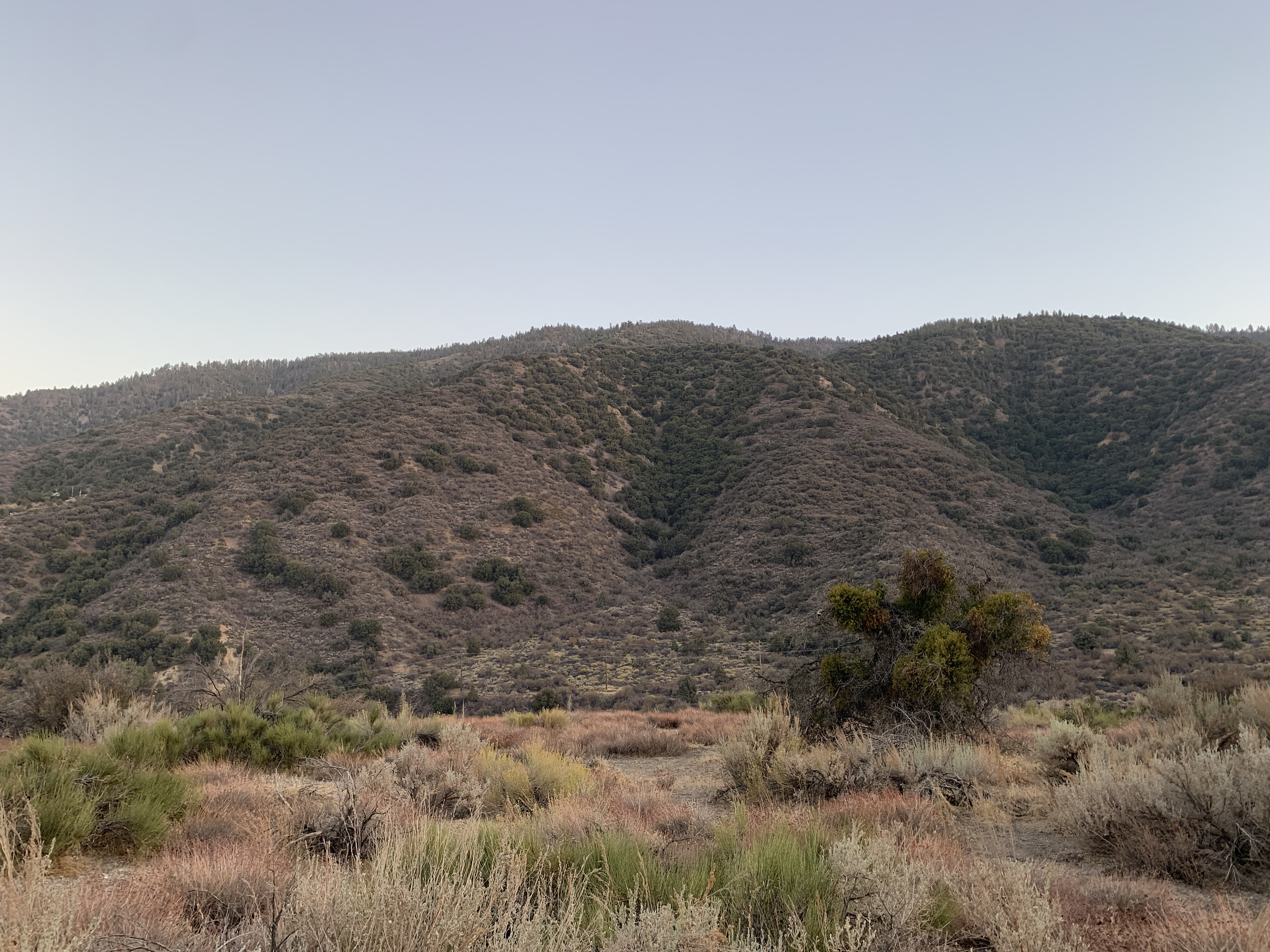
- Frazier Mountain as seen from Frazier Park

Highest point
- Elevation: 8,017 ft (2,444 m) NAVD 88
- Prominence: 2,440 ft (744 m)
- Listing: Hundred Peaks Section
- Coordinates: 34°46′30″N 118°58′09″W

Naming
- Native name: Toshololo (Ineseño)

Geography
- Location within California
- Location: Los Padres National Forest, Ventura County, California, U.S.
- Parent range: Transverse Ranges
- Topo map: USGS Frazier Mountain

Climbing
- Easiest route: Road

Frazier Mountain (Samala: Toshololo) is a broad, pine-forested peak in the Transverse Ranges System, within the Los Padres National Forest in northeastern Ventura County, California. At 8,017 feet (2,444 m), Frazier Mountain is the sixteenth-highest mountain in the Transverse Ranges of Southern California.

== Etymology ==
Frazier Mountain is named after the American miner William T. Frazer (with a spelling alteration), who worked in the area in the 1850s under his company the Frazier Mining Company.

To the Chumash people, Frazier Mountain is called Toshololo. In the Samala language it means "mountain of the east", referring to is location east of Iwihinmu (Mount Pinos) and cosmological associations with the morning star and the spring equinox. The mountain is considered sacred to the Chumash people as it is an important part of their history and culture.

== Geography ==
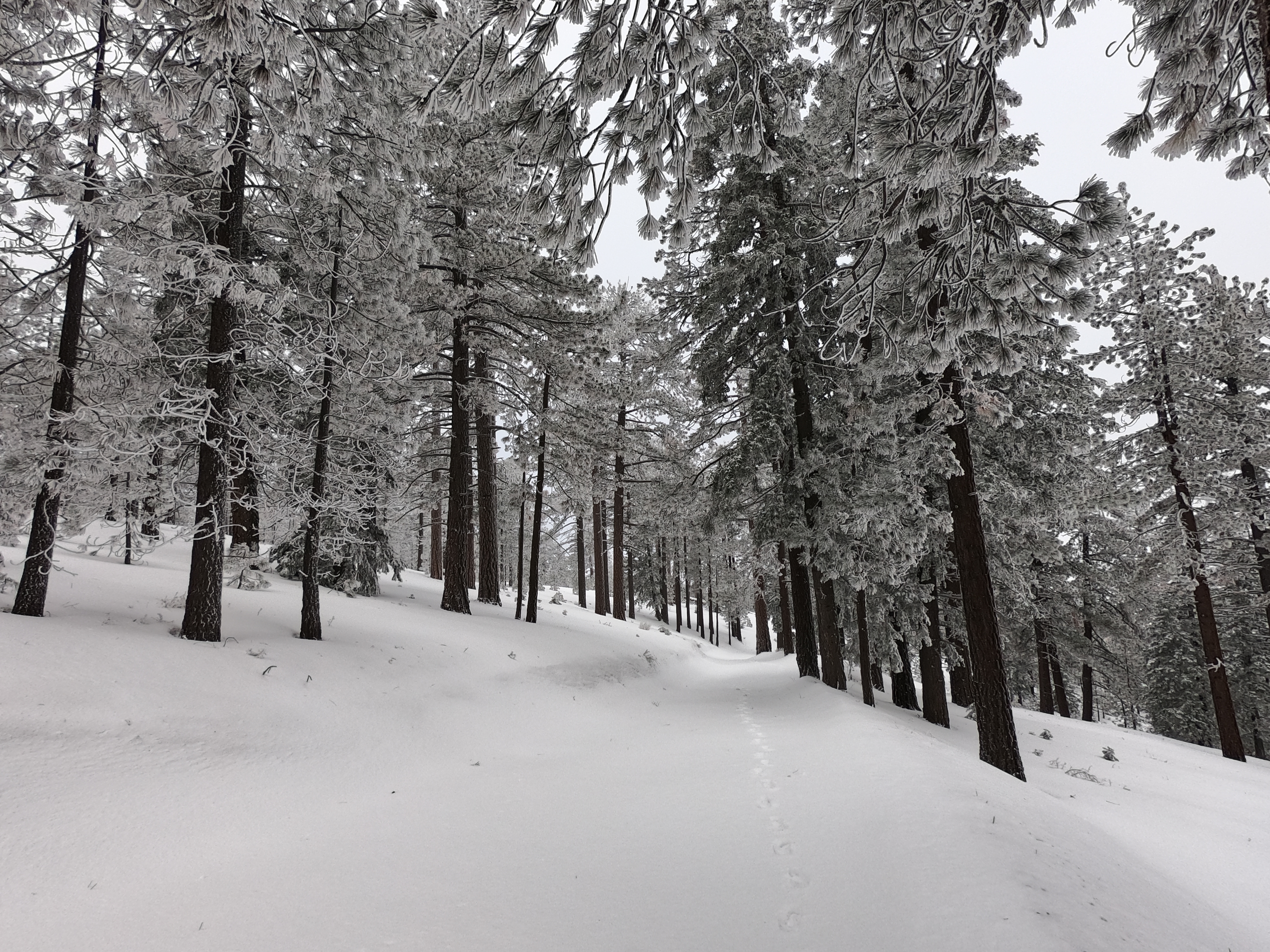
Snow at the top of Frazier Mountain. February 2019.

The community of Frazier Park and its outlying district of Lake of the Woods are northward of the mountain. The intersection of Ventura, Los Angeles, and Kern Counties lies just to the northeast. Interstate 5 runs to the east of the mountain, and Southern California Edison's Path 26 500 kV wires are at its eastern foothills.

Mount Pinos is 21.5 miles by road west of Frazier Mountain. Alamo Mountain and the Sespe Condor Sanctuary are to its south.

The summit of the mountain is a Forest Service lookout area with radio tower facilities as well as an abandoned fire lookout tower. The highest point is accessible by a forest road that is open when there is no snow present on the mountain.

== See also ==
- Transverse Ranges—related topics
- 1857 Fort Tejon earthquake — nearby on the San Andreas fault.
