= Naples, California =

Naples, California may refer to:

- Naples, Santa Barbara County, California, an unincorporated community
- Naples, Long Beach, a neighborhood of Long Beach, California
