= Mount Pinos =

Mountain of the Transverse Ranges in California, United States

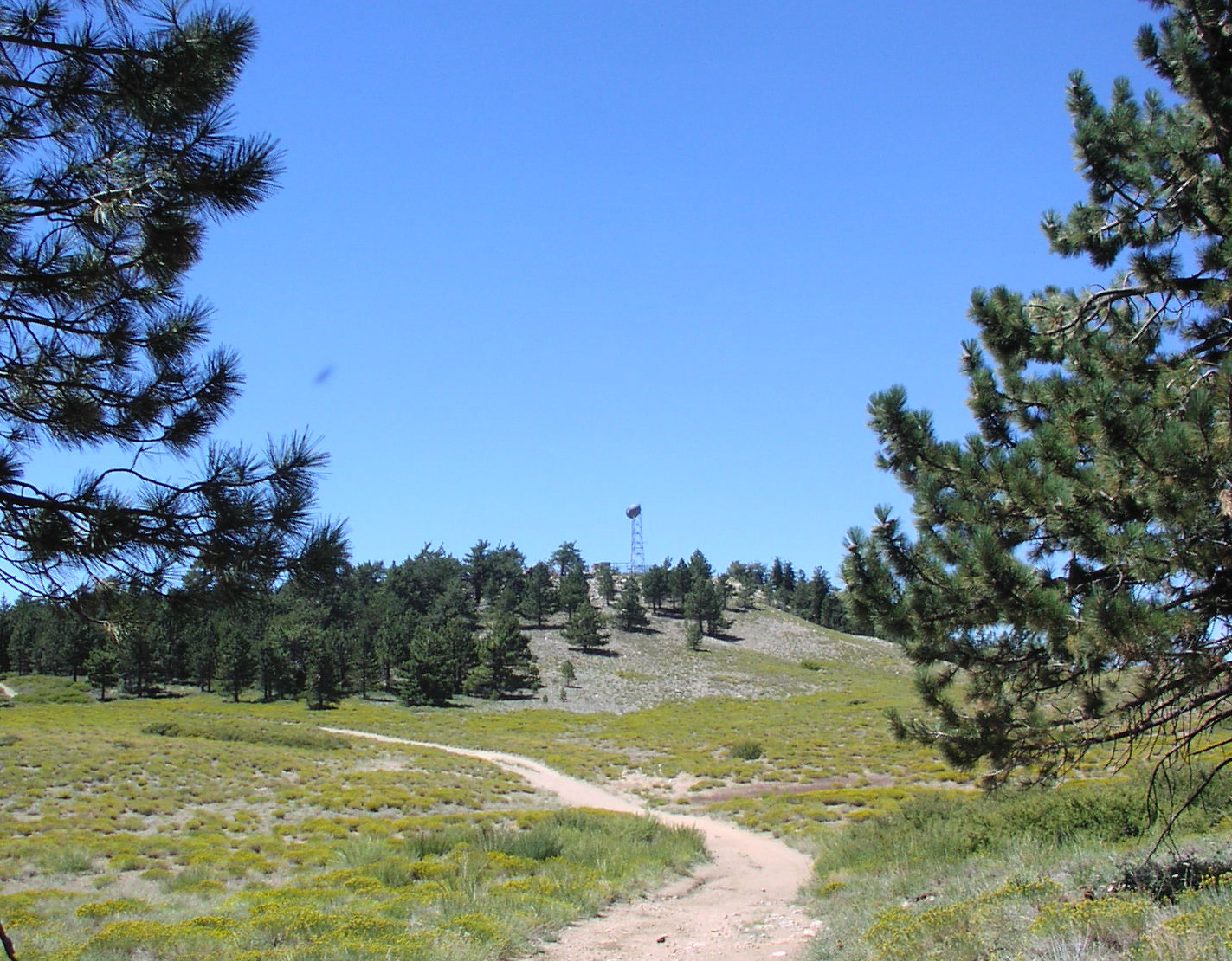
- Summit of Mount Pinos in the summer, from the east southeast

Highest point
- Elevation: 8,847 ft (2,697 m) NAVD 88
- Prominence: 4,800 ft (1,463 m)
- Listing: California county high points 22nd; Hundred Peaks Section
- Coordinates: 34°48′46″N 119°08′43″W

Naming
- Native name: 'Iwɨhɨnmu (Ineseño)

Geography
- Location within California
- Location: Kern and Ventura counties, California U.S.
- Parent range: Transverse Ranges
- Topo map: USGS Sawmill Mountain

Climbing
- Easiest route: Road hike

Mount Pinos (/ˈpaɪnoʊs/) (Samala: 'Iwɨhɨnmu) is a 8,847-foot (2,697 m) mountain in the Los Padres National Forest in the US state of California. Located on the boundary between Ventura and Kern counties, it is the highest point in Ventura County, the highest point of the Transverse Ranges west of Tejon Pass, and the southernmost point of the Salinian Block.

== Etymology ==
Mount Pinos ("pine" in Spanish) was named after its dominant timber.

To the Chumash people, Mount Pinos is called Iwihinmu. In the Samala language it means "a place of mystery", referring to its enigmatic place at the center of Chumash cosmology and spirituality. The summit is known as Liyikshup, Samala for the "center of the world", considered to be the exact center of the Chumash universe, as well as a place of harmony and spiritual tranquility. The mountain is considered sacred to the Chumash people as it is an important part of their history and culture.

== Geography ==
The summit of the mountain is relatively flat and open with several subsidiary summits. Open stands of conifers separated by chaparral shrub areas predominate.

The view from the summit on a clear day encompasses the southern Central Valley, the southernmost Sierra Nevada, much of northern Ventura county, much of the Santa Barbara County mountains, the Caliente Range and the Carrizo Plain. The trace of the San Andreas Fault, clearly visible to the northwest, cuts between Mount Pinos and the mountains immediately to the north. The trace extends all the way to Soda Lake in the Carrizo Plain along the Elkhorn Scarp. The lights of Bakersfield and surrounding towns are visible on a clear evening to the north and northeast.

== Geology ==
The mountain primarily consists of granitic rocks of the southern Salinian Block, in contrast to the nearby San Emigdio Mountains, which is primarily made of Precambrian metamorphic rock or Cenozoic sedimentary rock. Mount Pinos is therefore considered a geologically separate formation.

== Communities ==
The small community of Pine Mountain Club lies due north of Mount Pinos. Lake of the Woods and Frazier Park are about 10 miles (16 km) to the east.

== Climate ==
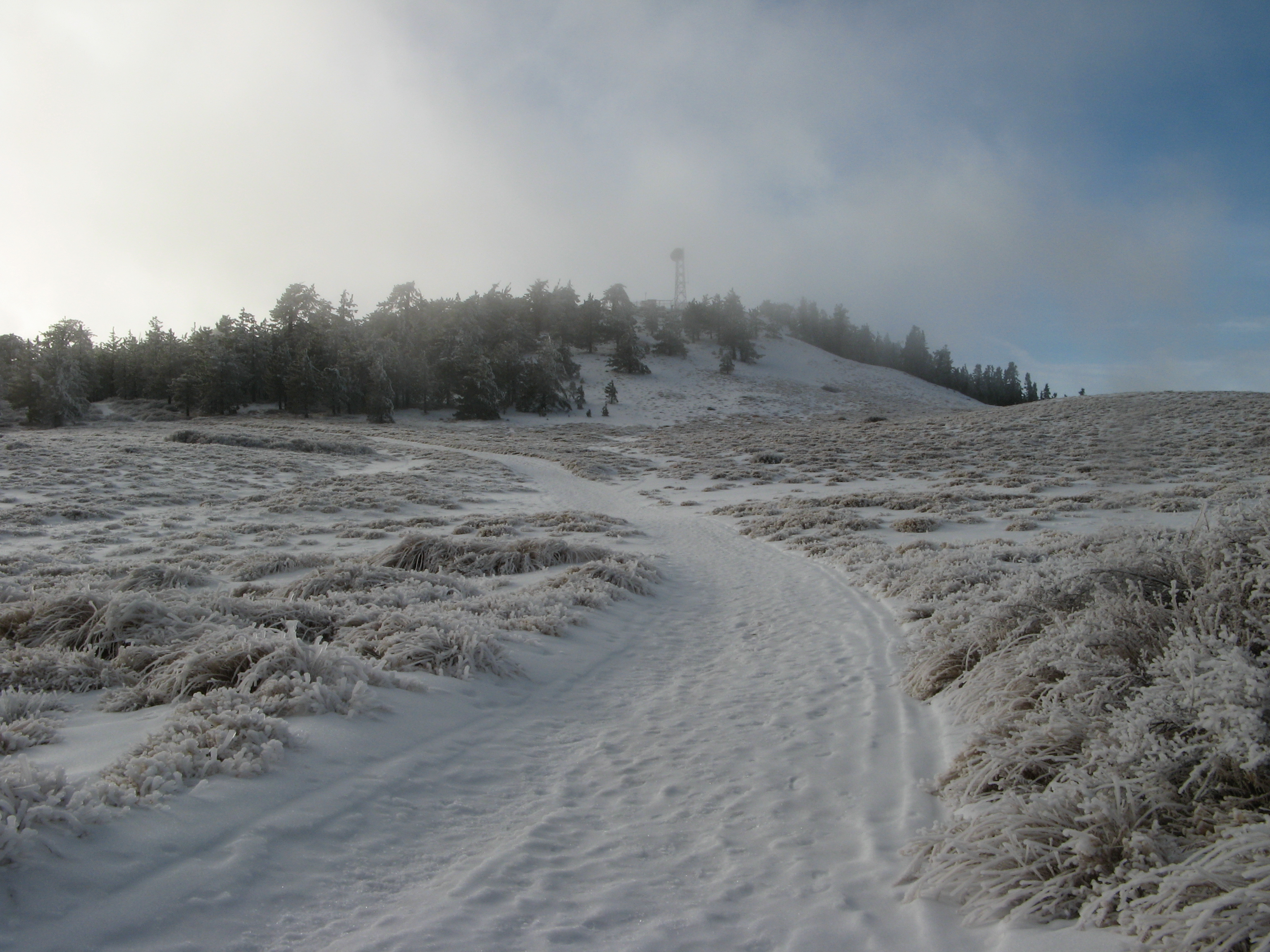
Summit of Mount Pinos in the snow, from the east-southeast

The summit plateau experiences harsh winters in comparison to most of Southern California. Most of the precipitation falls as winter snow. The area experiences several feet of snow each year with snowfields lasting till early June on the north facing slopes. In heavy snowfall years snowfields can last till late July or later. Temperatures fall to near freezing most days but can drop well into the single digits in the coldest months.

Summer months are mild with high temperatures between 70 °F (21 °C) and 80 °F (27 °C). The mountain experiences occasional thunderstorms with some delivering intense, localized downpours.

== Ecology ==
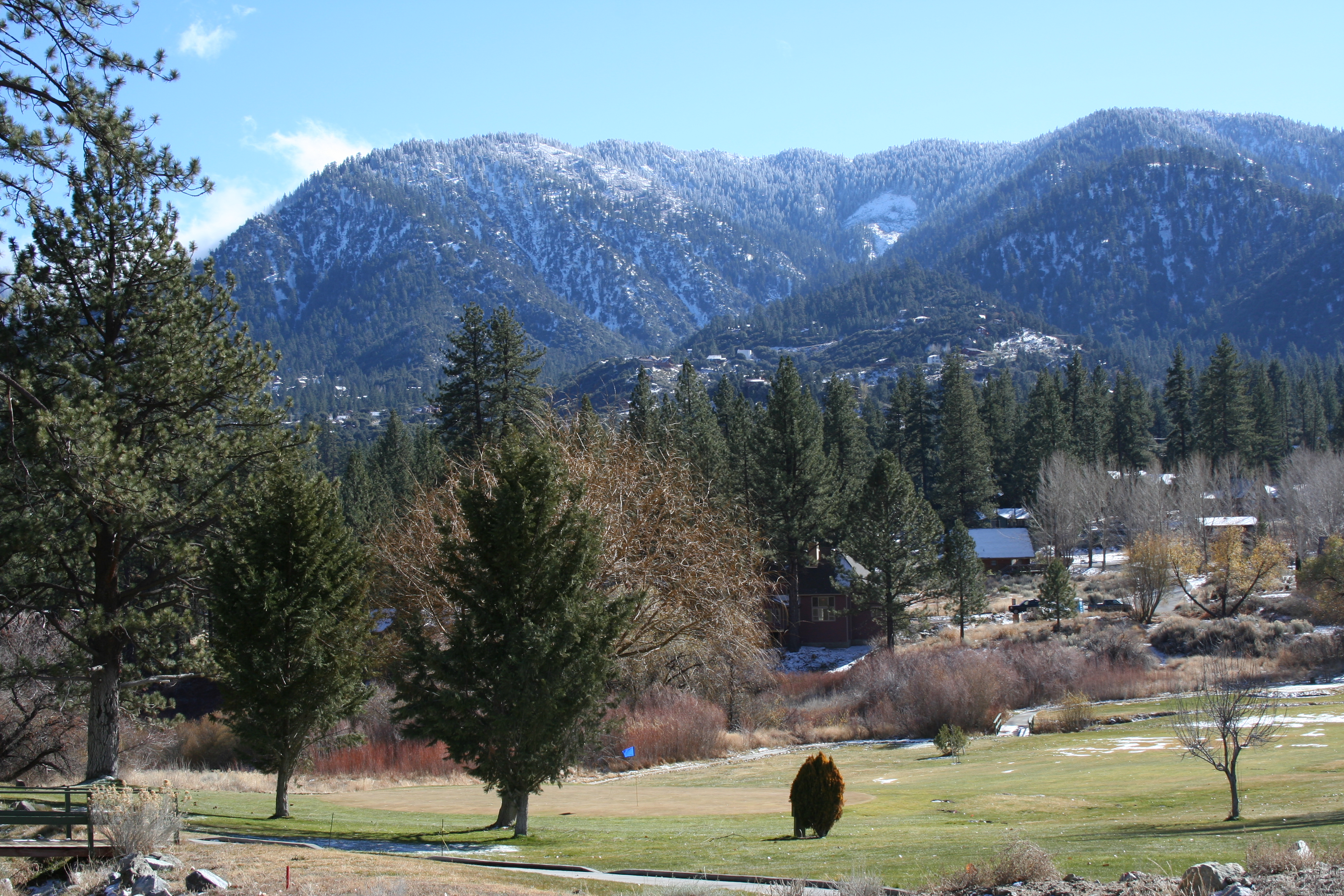
Mount Pinos, top left, taken from Pine Mountain Club located to the north-northwest.

=== Flora ===
Habitats on Mt. Pinos include:

- Southern mixed evergreen forests
- California montane chaparral and woodlands

=== Fauna ===
Mount Pinos is considered by ecologists to be home to one of the most significant populations of birds of prey in California. Five owl species, Northern Goshawks, as well as California Condors live in the area.

It is also home to alpine endemics such as the mountain quail, Clark's nutcracker, Steller's jay and pygmy nuthatch (best seen in campground), as well as hermit warbler (typical during migration) and green-tailed towhee.

== History ==
The mountain is sacred to all Native Americans in California, according to Arianne Chow-Garcia, chair of the Chalon Indian Council of Bakersfield. John Pryor, professor of anthropology and archaeology at California State University, Fresno, said that the land "is continuing to be used for ceremony."

== Hiking ==
The summit of Pinos can be reached by a 2-mile (3.2 km) hike along a dirt road from a parking area at the end of Los Padres National Forest Road S349S. The trail continues to the west entering the Chumash Wilderness and ends at Cerro Noroeste. Almost all of this 6-mile (9.7 km) trail is above 8,000 feet (2,400 m).

== Snow sports ==
View from Mount Pinos on a cold winter evening

Consistent snow conditions on Mount Pinos allows for many types of winter recreation. This includes Backcountry skiing, cross country and telemark skiing, snowshoeing, snowboarding, sledding, and snow camping. The network of ski trails and backcountry ski and snowboarding bowls on Mount Pinos are documented on several locally produced maps. The ski trails are part of a dispersed recreation area administered in partnership by the United States Forest Service, Los Padres National Forest and the Southern California Nordic Ski Patrol. The patrol operates the Nordic Base facility on weekends only in the winter. It is located at the top of Mount Pinos Road and adjacent to the Chula Vista parking lot.

From the Chula Vista parking lot a trail network spreads both uphill towards Condor Point and downhill reaching as far as McGill Campground. Skiing and boarding are also available in backcountry bowls on the north face of the peak and ridges that drop all the way down the mountain to about the 6,000-foot (1,828.8 m) level. Popular destinations include Condor Point, 1st and 2nd Meadows, and Inspiration Point. The Overlook trail accesses the North Ridge area which hosted an alpine ski area during the 1960s. The area lifts were rope tows situated on the three fingers of the drainage just north of Overlook trail.

More ambitious back country skiing can include trips to nearby Sheep Camp on Sawmill Mountain, Cerro Noroeste and if snow conditions allow a descent all the way to Pine Mountain Club.

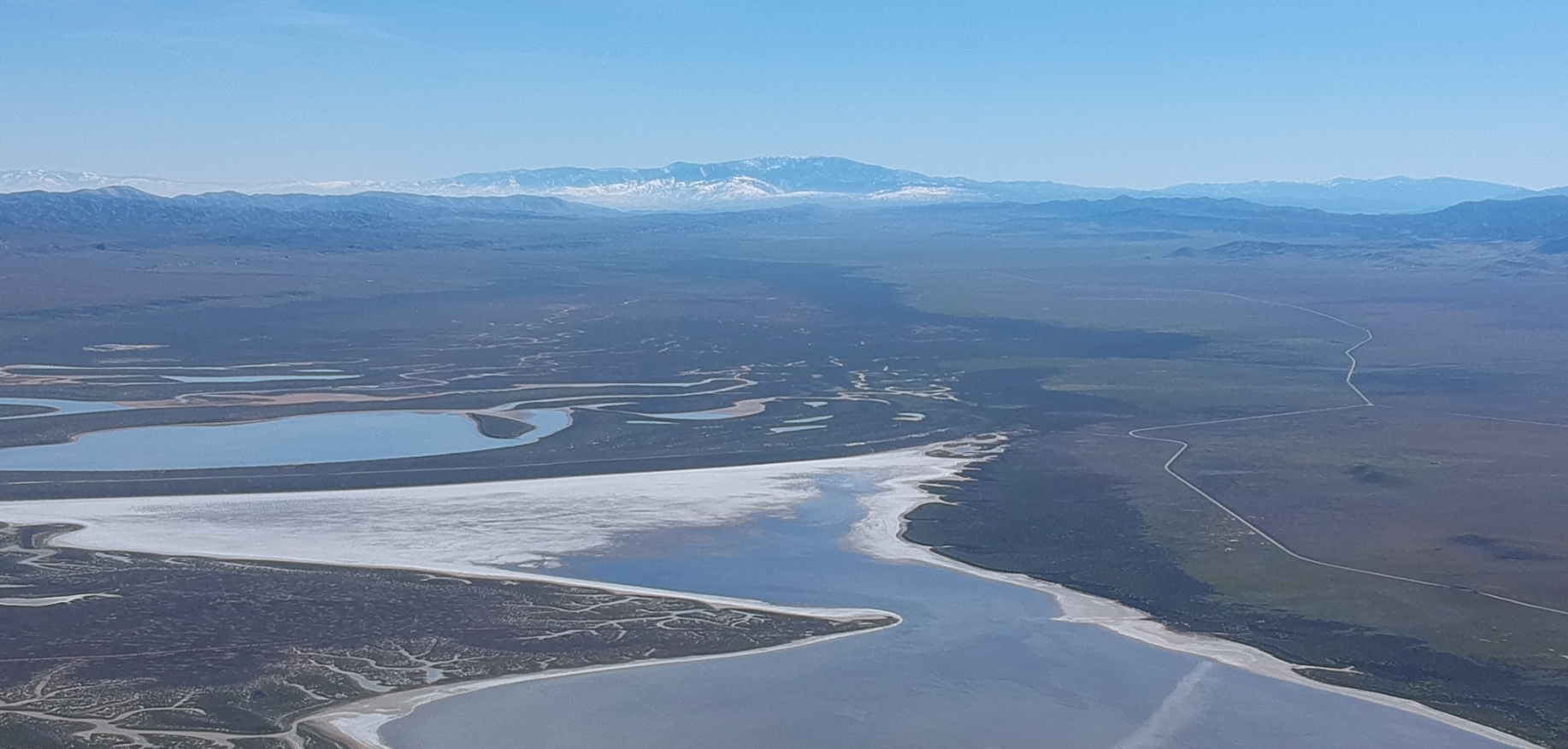
Mount Pinos from Carrizo Plain, with Soda Lake (San Luis Obispo County) in forefront.

During and immediately after heavy snow storms it may not be possible to drive to the top of Mount Pinos Road due to the lack of snow plow availability. In such cases it is common for the Kern County Roads Department to close a snow gate lower on the mountain. It is still possible to ski from the snow gate and enjoy the lower slopes of Mount Pinos. Snow at lower elevations also facilitates cross country skiing to Iris Point which provides great views of Lockwood Valley.

Some of these trails depend on sufficient snow pack. The trails are not declared hiking trails in the summer and consequently a separate hiking map is available from the Forest Service.

Other nearby recreational opportunities include astronomy, fishing, off-roading, horseback riding and bouldering.

== Astronomy ==
Mount Pinos is considered to be one of the best viewing sites in Southern California due to its relatively low light pollution, dry air and frequently clear skies contributing to good astronomical seeing. It is one of the favorite gathering places for amateur astronomers in the region. The usual viewing area is not the summit of the mountain, but the large tree-surrounded parking area of Chula Vista Campground at the end of the paved road about two miles east of the peak.

== See also ==
- Frazier Mountain
