= Chumash traditional narratives =

Chumash traditional narratives include myths, legends, tales, and oral histories preserved by the Chumash people of the northern and western Transverse Ranges, Santa Barbara—Ventura coast, and northern Channel Islands, in present-day Southern California.

Early analysts expected Chumash oral literature to conform to the regional pattern of Southern California narratives. However, little evidence was available before accounts from the papers of John Peabody Harrington began to be published in the 1970s. The narratives now seem to have stronger ties with central California than with the Takic and Yuman groups to the south.

== Research and recording ==
Despite their close ties to the Chumash, Spanish sources did little to collect information on native oral culture. In addition, the Chumash were roughly divided into 8 separate linguistic groups. Obispeño, Purismeño, Inezeño, Barbareño, Ventureño, Island, Cuyama, and Emigdiano varied to a degree where they were closer to separate languages than similar dialects. The Chumash weren’t a cultural or linguistic sovereignty in the traditional sense; they were a conglomeration of autonomous settlements. Most recording of Chumash narratives occurred through anthropological study, specifically Harrington’s papers.

== Characteristics ==
Like other Native American universes, the Chumash mythical universe is ordered, but still very uncertain. Events occur at the whim of supernatural beings capable of kindness and malevolence. Supernatural beings can be both rational and irrational at times, as humans may be. Chumash narratives vary in plot, but the “hero’s journey” and “trickster’s story” appear frequently in Chumash oral culture. The motives inspiring the protagonist, however, appear dubious by Western standards. Whereas Western fictional heroes are called to action and make decisions based on a clear set of choices, Chumash protagonists act based on an abstruse imperative or “must”.

Magic and death also appear commonly as literary devices. Conflict often arises between beings with innate magical powers and those who acquired their powers through magical objects or helpers. Death, wherever it occurred in native stories, was always reversible, and was usually undone with the aid of the aforementioned magical powers or special “medicines” bearing similar supernatural powers. Another commonly used literary device was inversion, where the opposite of what’s to be expected occurs, ex. supernatural beings consume only toxic materials, or events occurring at day versus night in the human world are chronologically switched in the underworld.

Time is not a strongly defined topic in Chumash folklore. Very little detail is placed on the creation of the universe and there’s little chronological order to narratives, suggesting that Chumash culture valued the idea of progress over time in a different way than the West. The universe was believed to have changed only very slightly in its history; one of the few transformative events was the Flood. The Flood was believed to have transformed the so-called “First People” into present day plants and animals. Modern humans were created by supernatural powers, and death was introduced to deal with overpopulation. The Flood separated Chumash mythology into an unspecified, indeterminate past, and the world we see today. Chumash narratives would transform further with the arrival of Europeans.

Again, similar to Western folklore, Chumash narratives often began and ended with idiomatic phrases. “When Coyote was human” or, “Momoy was a rich Widow,” analogous to “Once upon a time” in Western culture, were introductions to stories about the two most commonly seen characters in Chumash narratives. As the West had, “and they lived happily ever after…,” so the Chumash had an idiomatic expression roughly translating to “I am finished, it is the end.” Most storytelling occurred at night, and some stories were told only in Winter. The Chumash highly valued storytellers, and certain narratives were made privy only to subjects of certain social status. Chumash storytellers would integrate stories from elsewhere into their own beliefs, but despite this, Chumash narratives are significantly distinct from those of neighboring cultures.

== The universe and its origins ==
=== The Middle World and the First People ===
The Chumash believed their universe was divided into at least 3 worlds and groups of beings. The Middle world is occupied by humans. The first world above belongs to supernatural beings such as the Sun, and the Giant Eagle. The first world below is inhabited by monsters which enter the human world after dark. People were believed to be able to travel between worlds, but not without difficulty.

Prior to the Flood, the First People dwelled in the Middle world. These people were thought to be largely humanoid with some floral or faunal characteristics related to the plants or animals they would become after the Flood. Unlike other native groups, the Chumash excluded much of the animal kingdom from their folklore. Most of the animals mentioned are birds. Plants, reptiles, mammals, and insects are mentioned occasionally, and fish only have one representative among the First People. Bears, rattlesnakes, elk, whales, and other seemingly impressive animals don’t appear as characters in Chumash folklore.

Among the First People, Coyote appears the most in Chumash narratives as the archetype hero/trickster. Coyote can be thought of as an analogy for man; he has conflicting virtues and vices. Often portrayed as an old man, Coyote is powerful and knowledgeable, but wasn’t born into the high social stratus of the supernatural beings like the Great Eagle. Also featured prominently among the First People was Momoy. Momoy, depicted as an old woman, turned into Datura meteloides (a narcotic plant) after the Flood. She was a wealthy widow who lived in a far-away place alone or with a daughter. She herself doesn’t bear power within the universe, but she can take brief glimpses into the future, and inform individuals only the probable outcomes of their actions. One who drinks the water that Momoy uses to wash her hands will fall into a coma and receive visions pertaining to their future or destiny.

According to legends, the middle world was supported above the world below by two giant serpents, whose movements would cause earthquakes. The world above was held in place by the Giant Eagle. The middle world was believed to be flat and circular with a number of islands floating on an ocean. The Chumash live on the largest, most central island. To the West exists the land of the dead, filled with souls waiting to be reborn. The land of the dead contains 3 areas similar to purgatory, heaven, and hell: : wit, ʔayaya, and Šimilaqša.

=== The afterlife ===
In Chumash belief, the soul is a separate entity from the body, but one only experiences their soul separating from their body at least 3 days after death, or as a harbinger of death. In the case where a living person saw their own soul, it was possible to avoid death by ingesting Momoy or toloache. Immediately following death, the soul oversees the destruction of their property and revisits locations frequented in life before heading Westward to the land of the dead in a ball of light.

The soul first encounters two widows who live by merely smelling food and water and bathe themselves in a spring. The soul then travels to a ravine, where it must pass two deadly boulders and two giant ravens who attempt to peck out the eyes of the soul, replacing them with poppies. Then, the soul must pass a tall woman with a scorpion-like tail. She draws attention by clapping and will sting anyone who comes too near. Finally, the soul reaches the ocean spanned by a single bridge or pole. Beneath the consistently rising and falling bridge exists evil souls petrified from the neck down. Two monsters attempt to scare the traveling soul, who, if lacking requisite knowledge or power, will fall into the sea and be transformed into a fish or amphibian. Souls who pass this final test enjoy Šimilaqša, a land ruled by a chief in a crystal house, the Sun. Here, one will eat, sleep, and play for eternity, or until they are reincarnated.

The discussion of who enters Šimilaqša varies among Chumash groups. The Ventureño, for example, believe the spirits of children and those who drown do not enter Šimilaqša, but will be reincarnated after 12 years.

=== The First World above and supernatural beings ===
The world above was inhabited by supernatural beings such as the Sun, the Two Thunders, and the ʔelyeʔwun, or Giant Eagle. They generally exist in human form, but have supernatural powers and usually only intervene in human affairs to a minimal extent. They can be malevolent if so inclined and have more control over the universe than any other beings.

The Sun was portrayed as an extremely old widower living with two daughters in a crystal house. He and his daughters subsist off human flesh and bones. He wears nothing but a feathered headband in which he tucks the bodies of small children. He carries a torch made of bark which he uses to light the world beneath him. His daughters wear aprons made of live rattlesnakes. Every day, the Sun travels a path around the world and returns to his daughters with corpses to eat. Every day, the Sun plays peon with the Great Eagle against the Coyote of the Sky and the Morning Star. On the Winter solstice, the Moon decides who has won the game for the year. If the Sun wins, there will be a rainy year and bountiful crop yields. If the Sun loses, more people will suffer and die. Some Chumash families apparently stayed indoors all day during the Winter solstice.

The Great Eagle was seen as a hands-off leader of the first people's social order. The Great Eagle would spend most of his time in the first world meditating, lost in thought. His relatives, falcon, and two hawks play a more active leadership role. The roles of everyone else of the first people follow no distinct hierarchy and reflect societal roles and positions of the Chumash themselves.

The Coyote of the Sky appears to be one of the few supernatural powers largely trusted by the Chumash. The Coyote of the Sky was believed to support the welfare of the first people and humans below. The Inezeño view him as a father figure and pray to him specifically.

The monsters of the world below, however, were thought to be intrinsically malevolent supernatural beings that always pose a threat to humans. They were often described as grotesque, nocturnal, and misshapen.

== See also ==
- Traditional narratives (Native California)

== Sources for Chumash Narratives ==
- Applegate, Richard B. 1975. "Chumash Narrative Folklore as Sociolinguistic Data". Journal of California Anthropology 2:188-197. (Analysis of speech patterns in a myth.)
- Blackburn, Thomas C. 1974. Chumash Oral Traditions: A Cultural Analysis. Unpublished Ph.D. dissertation, Department of Anthropology, University of California, Los Angeles. (Revised and published in 1975.)
- Blackburn, Thomas C. 1975. December's Child: A Book of Chumash Oral Narratives. University of California Press, Berkeley. (Revised version of Blackburn's 1974 dissertation; 111 Chumash narratives of various sorts, including Orpheus, collected by John P. Harrington between 1912 and 1928, with a detailed discussion by Blackburn.)
- Dougan, Marcia. 1965. "Why Hummingbird Became Eagle". The Masterkey 39:77-78. (A brief myth from Santa Rosa.)
- Heizer, Robert F. 1955. "Two Chumash Legends". Journal of American Folklore 68:34, 56, 72. (Collected by Lorenzo G. Yates in 1887.)
- Luthin, Herbert W. 2002. Surviving through the Days: A California Indian Reader. University of California Press, Berkeley. (An Ineseño tale, "The Dog Girl," recorded in 1913 from Maria Solares by John P. Harrington, pp. 382–395.)
