= Naples, Santa Barbara County, California =

Unincorporated community in California, United States

Naples, California
- Unincorporated community
- Nickname: Dos Pueblos Ranch
- Location within California Location within the United States
- Coordinates: 34°26′27″N 119°57′33″W
- Country: United States
- State: California
- County: Santa Barbara
- Elevation: 92 ft (28 m)
- Time zone: UTC-8 (Pacific (PST))
  - Summer (DST): UTC-7 (PDT)
- Area codes: 805 & 820
- GNIS feature ID: 1656581

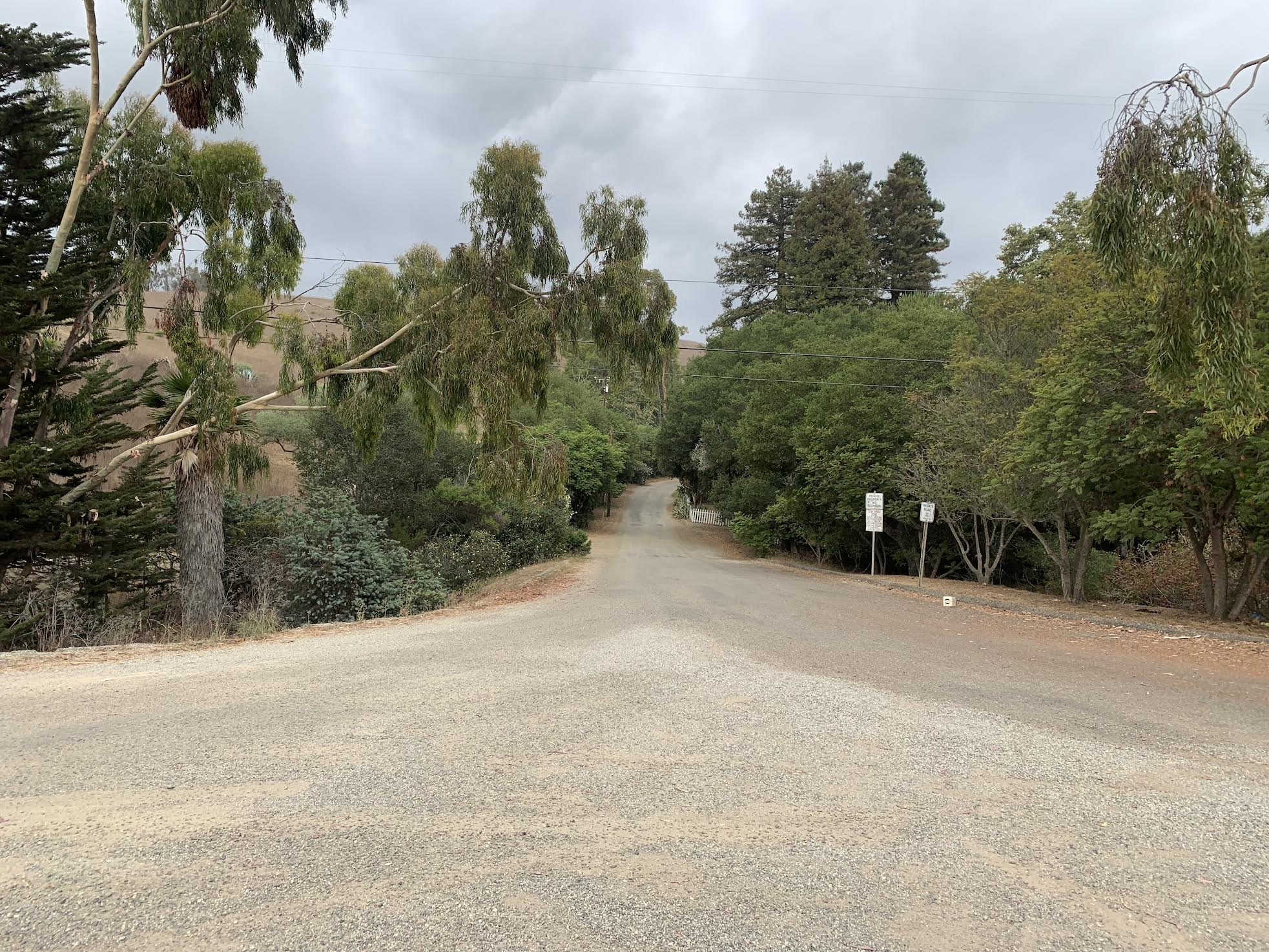
Entrance to the community as of August 2021.

Naples is an unincorporated area in Santa Barbara County, California, United States on the southern portion of the Gaviota Coast. Also known as Dos Pueblos Ranch, it is located on U.S. Highway 101 5.9 miles (9.5 km) west-northwest of Isla Vista.

Dos Pueblos refers to two Chumash villages that existed when in 1542 explorer Juan Rodríguez Cabrillo wrote about seeing them. The villages of Kuya'mu and Mikiw were across the creek from each other. A subdivision map was filed to create a community but the parcels were not developed.
