= Kuya'mu, California =

Chumash village on the coast of California, United States

Kuya'mu was a Native American village of the Chumash people located on the Gaviota Coast in the modern-day county of Santa Barbara, California in the United States.

In 1602, the Viscaino expedition stopped by the Goleta Valley and the nearby Chumash village of Mikiw, known today as Dos Pueblos . The village was situated on the Pacific coast, at the site of the current Dos Pueblos in the city of Goleta, California. To its west, across the Dos Pueblos Creek, was the adjacent coastal village of Mikiw.

In August 1769, the Spanish missionary and explorer Juan Crespí recorded that Mikiw and Kiya'mu were "very large villages with vast numbers of people and a great many houses in each, where they have their towns at the very edge of the sea."
