= Chumash Casino Resort =

Casino and resort in Santa Ynez, California

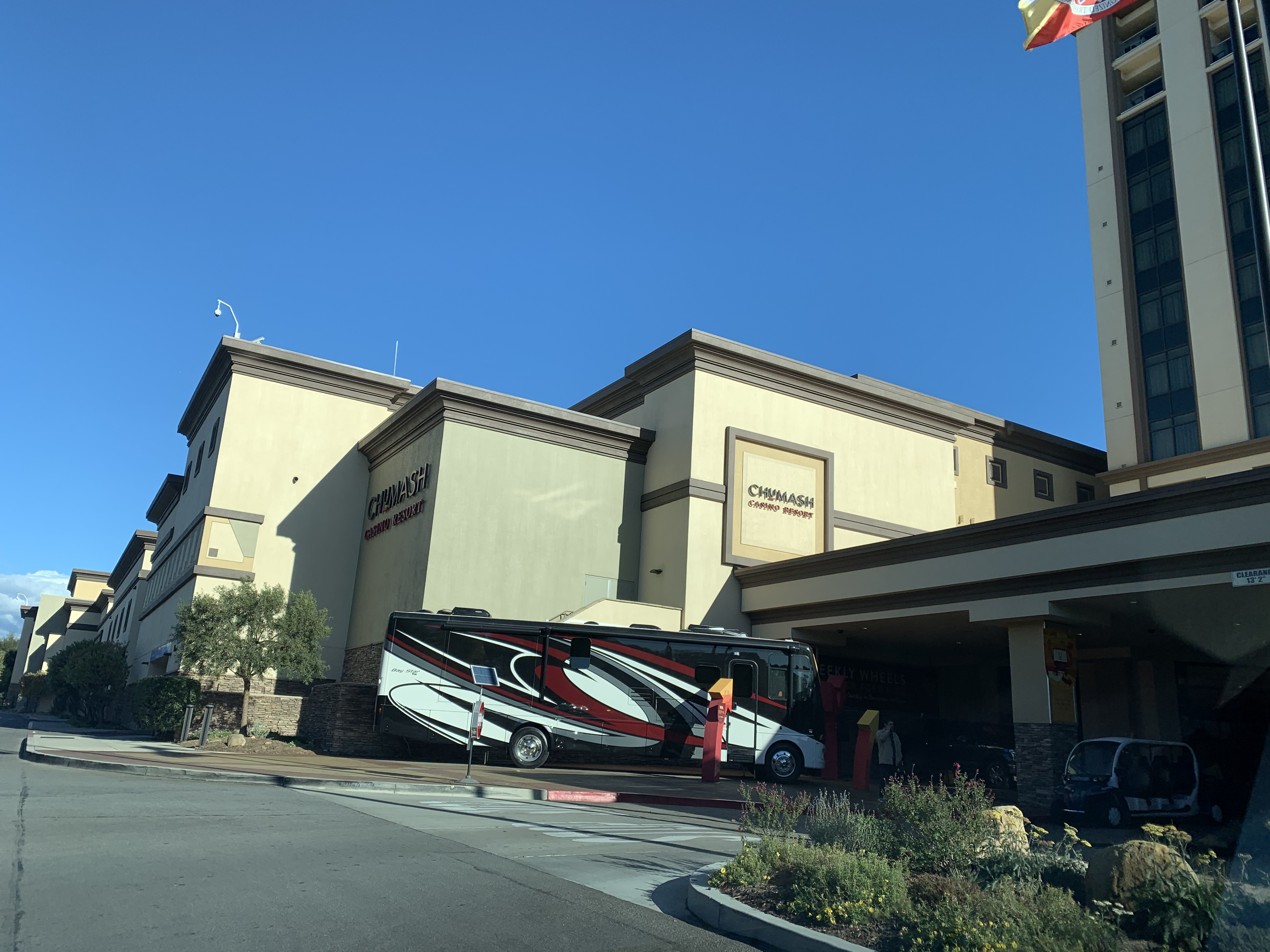
- Interactive map of Chumash Casino Resort
- Location: Santa Ynez, California; 3400 CA-246, Santa Ynez, CA 93460; 34.609°N 120.087°W
- Opened: August 2003
- No. of rooms: 320
- Owner: Santa Ynez Band of Chumash Mission Indians
- Website: https://chumashcasino.com/

The Chumash Casino Resort is owned and operated by the Santa Ynez Band of Chumash Mission Indians. Chumash is located near Santa Ynez Airport, in the Santa Ynez Indian Reservation, about 5 miles (8.0 km) east of Solvang, California.

== History ==
Opened in its present form in August 2003, the casino consists of a 94,000-square-feet (8,730 m^{2}) gaming area with slot machines and table games. A 106-room hotel and spa opened in July 2004. In 2006, the Casino estimated that there were 2,894,561 visitors to the Casino and 34,049 guests in the hotel, nearly all of them from Southern California. The Santa Ynez Band of Chumash Mission Indians have estimated that their casino brings in some 6,000 patrons per day.

== Music ==
Musicians who have appeared include : Al Green, Charlie Daniels, Clint Black, Cristian Castro, The Doobie Brothers, Fleetwood Mac, Hank Williams Jr., Intocable, Johnny Mathis, Kenny Rogers, Kiss, Los Tigres del Norte, The Moody Blues, Pepe Aguilar, Rose Royce, Smokey Robinson, The Spinners, and ZZ Top.

== Sport ==
Chumash hosts Elite Xtreme Combat mixed martial arts as well as the Star Voice competition show.

== See also ==
- Native American gaming
- List of casinos in California
- Solvang, California
- Santa Ynez Valley
