= Lompoc Museum =

History Museum in Lompoc, California

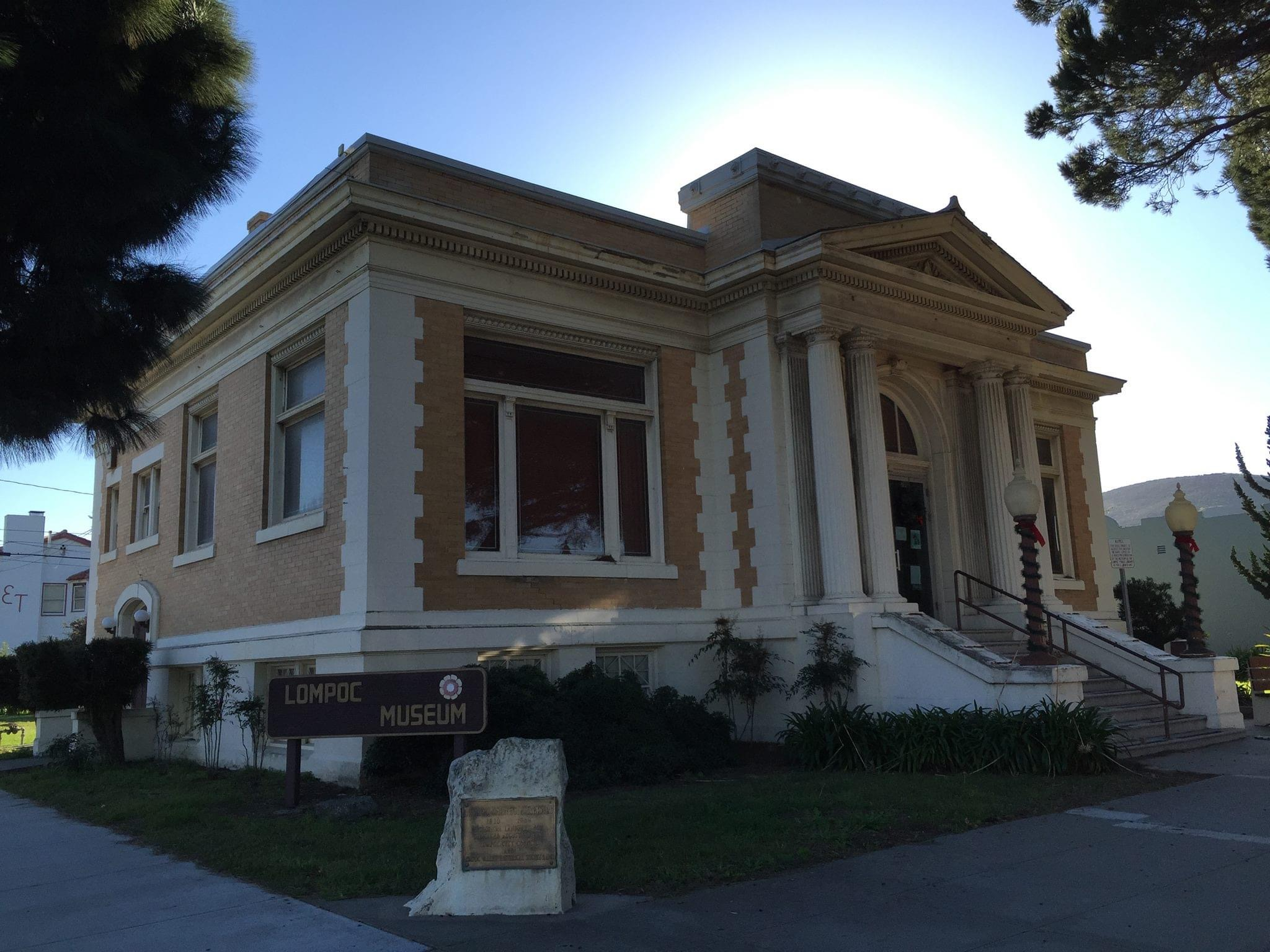
- Established: 1969
- Location: 200 South H St. Lompoc, California, United States
- Coordinates: 34.637119°N 120.457555°W
- Type: Local history
- Website: Official website

The Lompoc Museum is a museum preserving and interpreting the history of the Lompoc area and is located in the town of Lompoc, California. The museum offers interpretive programs, exhibits, multi-media presentations and special events. The museum is located in a former Carnegie library building, built in 1910.

== Exhibits ==
The center contains several permanent exhibits.

- The Native American History of the Lompoc area featuring displays including the Chumash people and how they lived as interpreted from diorama, their steatite tools and bowls, and baskets left from ancestors.
- The local Lompoc Valley Historical Society has displays of a seven million year old dolphin fossil found in local diatomaceous earth, diatomaceous fish fossils, relics of the Honda Point disaster, and information about the local flower industry.

Educational tours are also offered to area geological, archaeological, and historical sites of the Chumash Indians.
