= Maria Solares =

Chumash ancestor (1842–1923)

- Qilikutayiwit
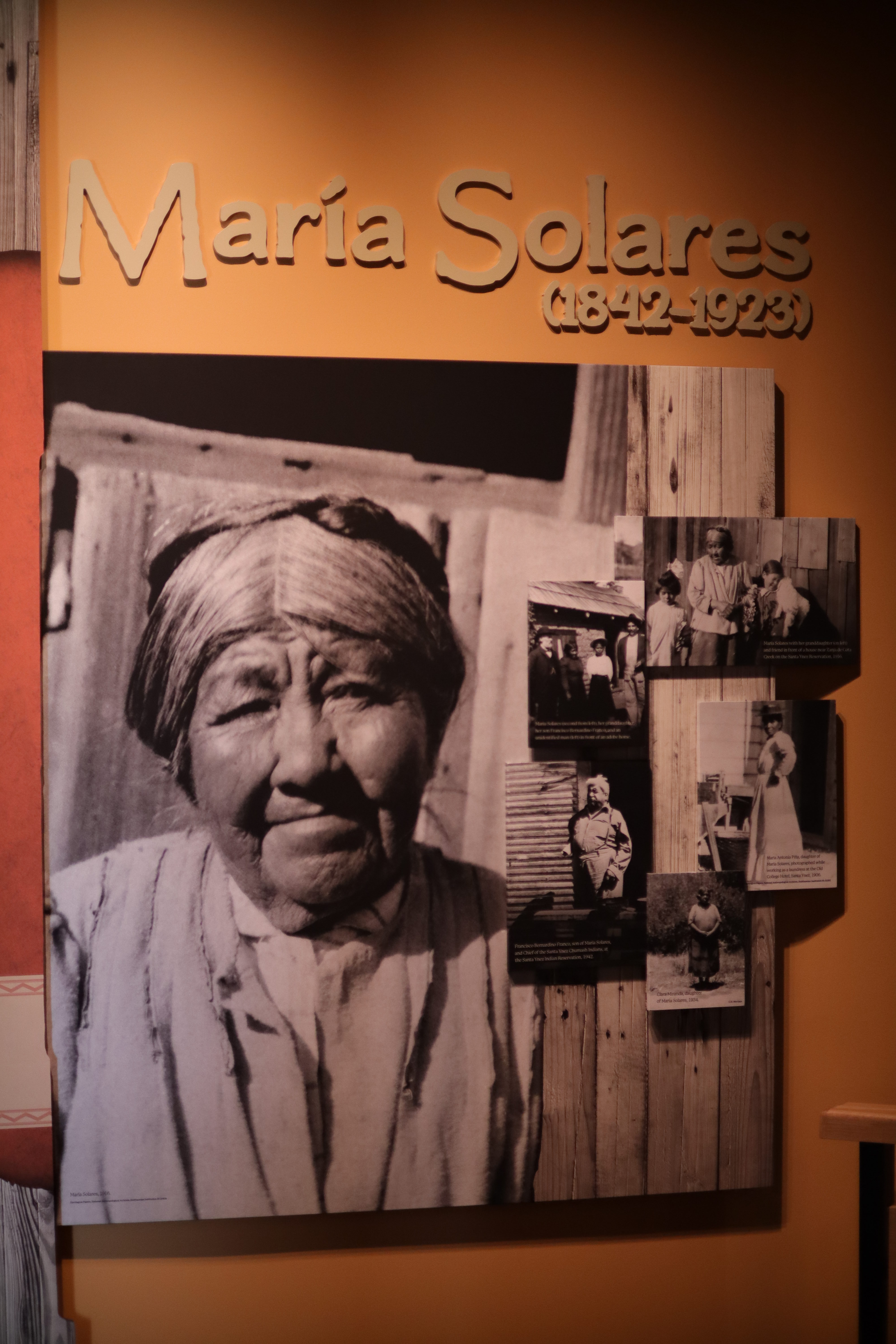
- María Solares, who worked extensively with John P. Harrington to document the Samala Chumash language and culture
- Born: 15 Apr 1842; Monterey, Alta California
- Died: 6 Mar 1923; Santa Barbara, California
- Other names: Qilikutayiwit, Maria Ysidora del Refugio, Maria del Refugio, Maria Brigida, Maria Isabel del Refugio Solares, Maria Refugio Solares
- Citizenship: American
- Occupation: Laundress/at home
- Known for: Documenting the Samala Chumash language and culture
- Spouses: Joaquin (1861–1863); Manuel (1863–1866); Nicomedes Liberado (1866–1868); Frank Estrada (1868–1870); Jose Gallego (1870–1872); Manuel Solares (1872–1923)
- Children: 4: Maria, Clara, Jose, Francisco "Frank"
- Parents: Benvenuto (father); Brigida (mother)

Maria Solares (US: /ˈmɑːriə soʊˈlɑːrɛs/, Spanish: Maria Solares; born Qilikutayiwit, also known as Maria Ysidora del Refugio, c. April 1842 – March 1923) was a Native Californian woman belonging to the Chumash people, notable for her association with documenting and preserving the Samala Chumash language and culture.

Maria has been the focus of controversy, believing her to be a non-Chumash tribe member among other accusations. However John R. Johnson, an adjunct professor of anthropology at UCSB, has researched the history of Maria's ancestors in the Santa Ynez Valley and found that her parents, grandparents, and great grandparents were all on church records as being baptized at Mission Santa Inés.

== Early life ==
Qilikutayiwit was born in Monterey, Alta California on 15 April 1842. She was Christened fifteen days later on 30 April 1842 and given the name of Maria Ysidora del Refugio. Her father Benvenuto was Samala Chumash and her mother Brigida was Hometwoli Yokuts. Maria documented her early life and travels in the region, observations of flora and fauna of what it must have been like traveling in the area.

== Chumash contributions ==
Maria Solares is attributed with working with John P. Harrington as one of the last fluent Samala Chumash speakers. She contributed songs recorded on wax cylinders, stories, placenames and their translations and is credited with being a significant ancestor who preserved the Samala Chumash culture. Harrington's notes and recordings of Maria are archived at the Smithsonian Museum and have been used by Richard Applegate to recompile the Samala language, the Western Institute for Endangered Language Documentation has also used her notes for the Purisimeño language. The Elders Council of the Santa Ynez Band of Chumash Indians has compiled a two-volume 700-page book set covering Maria's contributions. Maria also gave a native account of the Chumash Revolt of 1824. The Santa Ynez Band of Chumash Mission Indians have created a bust, placed at her approximate height, in her honor on display at the Santa Ynez Chumash Museum & Cultural Center (to be opened in 2023).

== Legacy ==
Dr. Richard Applegate created a Samala Dictionary in 2008 based on Maria's notes and recordings, essentially reviving the language for future generations based on her words.
