= Mikiw, California =

Mikiw was a Native American village of the Chumash people located in the modern-day county of Santa Barbara, California in the United States.

In 1602, the Sebastián Vizcaíno expedition stopped by the Goleta Valley and the nearby Chumash village of Mikiw. The village was situated on the Pacific coast, at the site of the current Dos Pueblos in the present day city of Goleta, California. To its east, across the Dos Pueblos Creek, was the adjacent coastal village of Kuya'mu. The two settlements on either side of Dos Pueblos Creek, at the ocean's edge, undoubtedly impressed Crespi.

In August 1769, the Spanish missionary and explorer Juan Crespí recorded that Mikiw and Kiya'mu were "very large villages with vast numbers of people and a great many houses in each, where they have their towns at the very edge of the sea."
