= Santa Ynez Band of Chumash Mission Indians =

Native Chumash Indians in Southern California

Santa Ynez Band of Chumash Mission Indians Samala
- Santa Ynez Reservation

Total population
- 154 enrolled members

Regions with significant populations
- United States (California)

Languages
- English, historically Ineseño

Related ethnic groups
- other Chumash people

The Santa Ynez Band of Chumash Mission Indians is a federally recognized tribe of Chumash, an Indigenous people of California, in Santa Barbara. Their name for themselves is Samala. The locality of Santa Ynez is referred to as ’alaxulapu in Ineseño, a Chumashan language.

== Government ==
The Santa Ynez Band is headquartered in Santa Ynez, California. They are governed by a democratically elected, five-member tribal council. Their current tribal administration is as follows:

- Chairman: Kenneth Kahn
- Vice-chairman: Mike Lopez
- Secretary/Treasurer: Maxine Littlejohn
- Business Committee Member: Gary Pace
- Business Committee Member: Raul Armenta

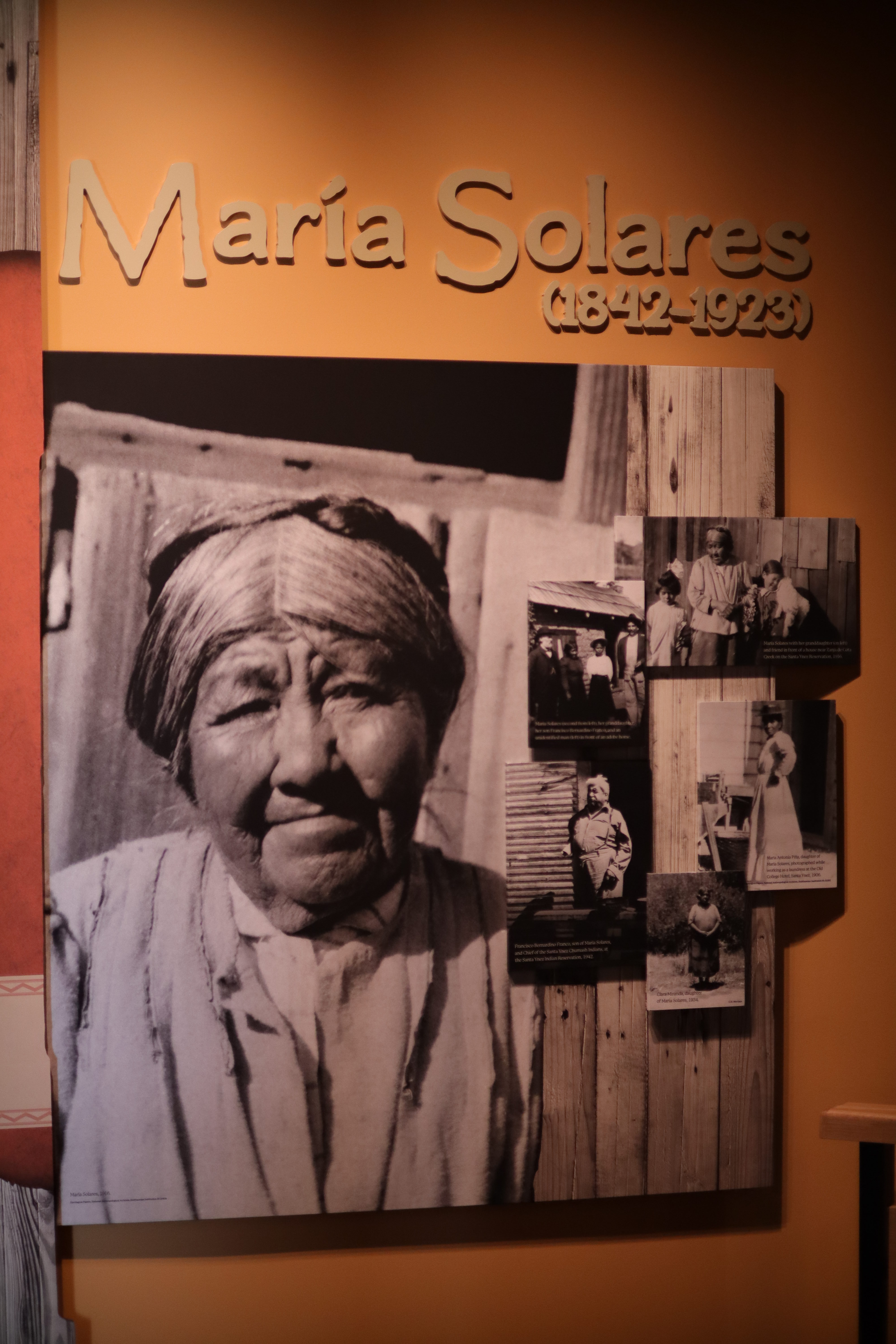
A photo taken at the Santa Ynez Chumash Museum showing photos of Maria Solares (1842-1923), one of the last speakers of the Samala language

== Reservation ==
The Santa Ynez Indian Reservation (34°36′10″N 120°05′29″W) is the only Chumash reservation. It was 127-acres large and was established on 27 December 1901. Beginning in 1979, the tribe established a housing program and began improving the infrastructure on the reservation.

=== Expansion ===
In 2019 the Santa Ynez Indian Reservation was allowed to place Camp 4 into tribal trust lands, expanding the reservation an additional 1,390 acres

== Samala Chumash language ==
The last native speaker of the Samala Chumash language, also called Ineseño, died in 1965. Verbal inheritance was lost with the death of the last native speaker. The language was revived through documents and archives, which created a sense of pride among modern Chumash descendants.

In the early 1900s linguist/ethnographer John P. Harrington worked with Maria Solares, one of the last fluent speakers of Samala. He created manuscripts containing information on Chumash language, culture, and traditions. Dr. Richard Applegate, who received a PhD in linguistics from U.C. Berkeley, used these manuscripts to write an extensive grammar of Samala and compile a dictionary of the language, which was released in 2008. Dr. Applegate and Nakia Zavalla, the Cultural Director for the Santa Ynez Band of Chumash and a direct descendant of Maria Solares, have begun an effort to revitalize the language. Applegate began teaching Samala in 2003, and Zavalla has spearheaded an immersion-based language apprentice program. As of 2008, Applegate had five language apprentices; however, none had yet reached full fluency.

An online Samala Chumash tutorial is available.

== Economic development ==
The Santa Ynez Band owns and operates the Chumash Casino Resort, as well as the Corque Hotel, Chumash Cafe, the Creekside Buffet, The Willows restaurant, and Root 246, (formerly the third largest employer in Solvang, 105, until its closure in 2021) all in Santa Ynez, California.

== Education ==
The reservation is served by the College Elementary School District and Santa Ynez Valley Union High School District.

== Arlington Springs Man ==
In April 2022, under the federal law Native American Graves Protection and Repatriation Act (NAGPRA), the remains of Arlington Springs Man was repatriated to the band. He was an ancient Paleoindian Indigenous American whose remains were found in 1959 on Santa Rosa Island, one of the Channel Islands located off the coast of Southern California. He lived about 13,000 years Before Present, making his remains some of the oldest dated in North America. The claim for repatriation was made by the tribe in October 2021, along with a request to return other tribal items held by the Santa Barbara Museum of Natural History. Tribal Chair Kenneth Kahn commented that "These items have come home to our tribe, and it allows us to do the important work of repatriation and reburial."
