= Ineseño language =

Extinct Chumashan language

Ineseño
- Sʰamala
- Native to: United States
- Region: California
- Ethnicity: Ineseño
- Extinct: 1965
- Revival: 2003
- Language family: Chumashan: Southern; Central; Ineseño

Language codes
- ISO 639-3: inz
- Glottolog: ines1240

Ineseño (Ineseño: Sʰamala) is an extinct and revitalizing Chumashan language spoken in southern California. It was closely related to, and may have been a dialect of, Barbareño. Ineseño is currently undergoing processes of language revitalization. An Ineseño dictionary was published in 2007.

== Phonology ==
=== Consonants ===
		Labial	Dental		Palatal	Velar	Uvular	Glottal
Stop/Affricate	plain	p	t	ts	tʃ	k	q	ʔ
Stop/Affricate	glottalized	pʼ	tʼ	tsʼ	tʃʼ	kʼ	qʼ	
Stop/Affricate	aspirated	pʰ	tʰ	tsʰ	tʃʰ	kʰ	qʰ	
Spirant	plain			s	ʃ		χ	h
Spirant	glottalized			sʼ	ʃʼ		χʼ	
Spirant	aspirated			sʰ	ʃʰ			
Sonorant	plain	m w	n l		j			
Sonorant	glottalized	ˀm ˀw	ˀn ˀl		ˀj			

=== Vowels ===
	Front	Central	Back
High	i	ɨ	u
Low	e	a	o
