= Daisy Cave =

Archeological site in California

Coordinates: 34.0391°N 120.3231°W

Location of the Daisy Cave on San Miguel Island.

Daisy Cave, also known as CA-SMI-261, is an archeological site located on San Miguel Island in California. San Miguel Island is the westernmost island in the Channel Islands. The island sits between the Santa Barbara Channel and the Pacific Ocean and is often battered by year-round winds, but the Daisy Cave itself provides protection from the weather. The cave appears to have multiple archaeological deposits, in which artifacts ranging from the "terminal Pleistocene to the present." San Miguel was once part of a larger 'Superisland,' connected with Santa Rosa, Santa Cruz, and Anacapa to make up Santarosae. Santarosae existed as the 'superisland' until as recent as 10,000 years ago, with some estimation.

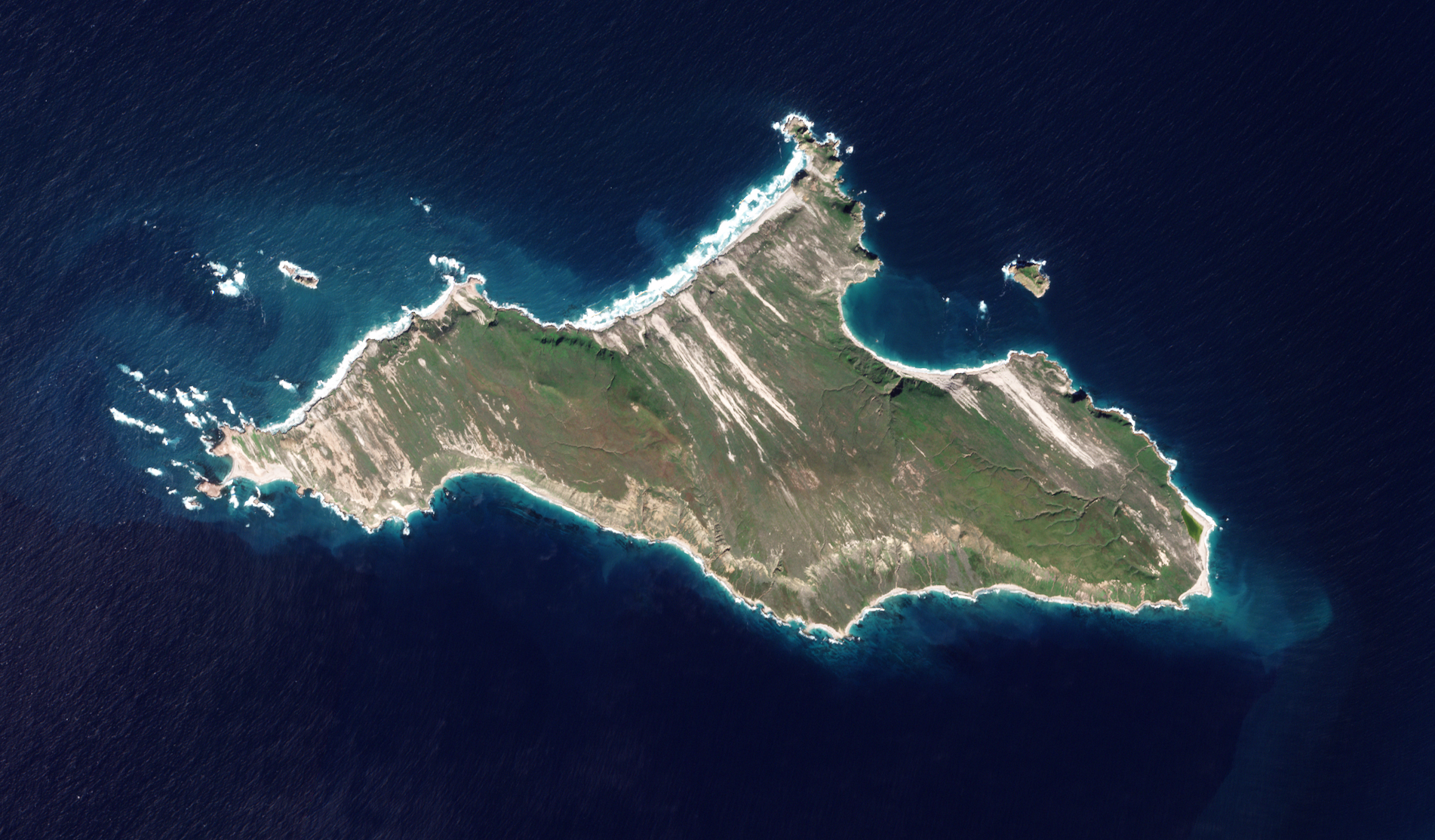
San Miguel Island, home to the Daisy Cave.

== Excavation ==
The first excavations of the Daisy Cave are estimated to have occurred around the early 1900s. These initial excavations were neither well documented, nor well executed; therefore, the 1967 excavation led by Charles Rozaire is largely considered to be the first true scientific excavation. Rozaire, who was curator of archeology at the Los Angeles County Museum of Natural History, led a team that excavated approximately 20 percent of the deposits within the Daisy Cave; however, the technology used to determine the age of the team's findings was imprecise. Within this first excavation, the remains of an estimated 26 people were found, along with other various artifacts and remains.

The next excavation occurred in 1985, when Daniel A. Guthrie, Don P. Morris, and Pandora E. Snethkamp conducted another, smaller excavation. They discovered "invaluable faunal and artifactal remains," and this was the first time that evidence was dated to be from the Pleistocene, rather than being from the last 3,000 years as Rozaire had suggested. The quality of the evidence was invaluable, but the quantity was lacking; these scholars also took the opportunity to correctly date the artifacts that Rozaire had recovered in his 1967 excavation.

In 1989, Don P. Morris, S. Hammersmith, and Jon. M Erlandson completed a map of the Daisy Cave and scheduled further site studies and investigations. Erlandson planned investigations for the summers of 1992, 1993, 1994, and 1996. These efforts "completed the stratigraphically controlled excavation of three 50 cm x 100 cm wide test units in the deposits outside the rockshelter and an exploratory sounding extending Rozaire's test pit inside the cave deeper into stratified sediments beneath the cave floor."

== Artifacts ==
The Daisy Cave serves as a time capsule into the lives of Paleo-Indians, Paleo-Coastal peoples, and other maritime populations (ordered sequentially). Each of the relics found in the Daisy Cave provides valuable insight into the lives of the Paleo-Indians and those who came after, as well as the land in which they existed. Artifacts that have been collected include pieces of basketry, various animal fossils, plant remains, shells, and stone tools.

=== Cordage ===
Pieces of cordage and basketry from the Holocene (11,700 years ago to the present) have been found in deposits within the Daisy Cave. During Rozaire's 1967 excavation, "over 400 pieces of cordage, clumps of sea grass, and a 13.5 cm x 6 cm piece of a twined sea grass mat or robe" were found deeper within the cave. The most ancient pieces of basketry (which is a general term used to describe "baskets, bags, matting, sandals, and other items made with similar techniques and materials") were discovered in the 1990s and compete in age with some of the oldest fauna remains that have been found at the site.

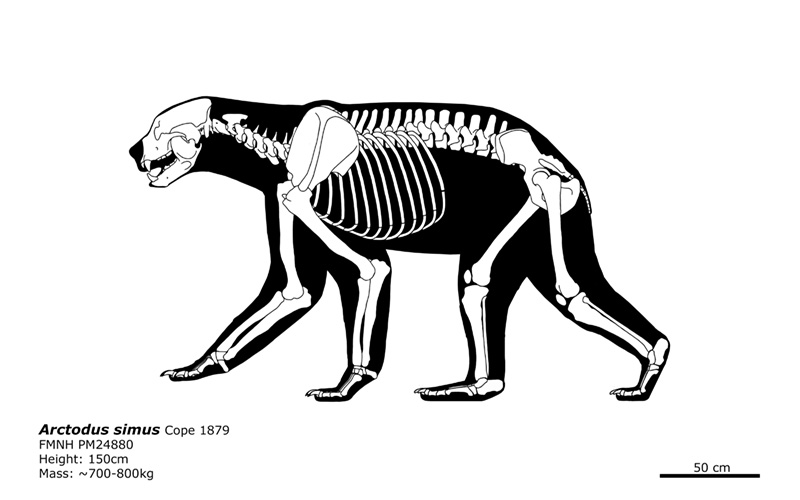
A skeletal drawing of the short-faced bear, evidence of which has been found by the Daisy Cave.

=== Fossils ===
Unlike the mainland of California, an extensive variation of animals is not prevalent. Evidence of dogs, foxes, skunks, birds, and mice has been found during the many excavations that have taken place since the early 1900s. Some of the most striking fossil discoveries within the Daisy Cave include those of various rodent species, evidence of the short-faced bear, and the remains of two mammoth species.

=== Diet ===
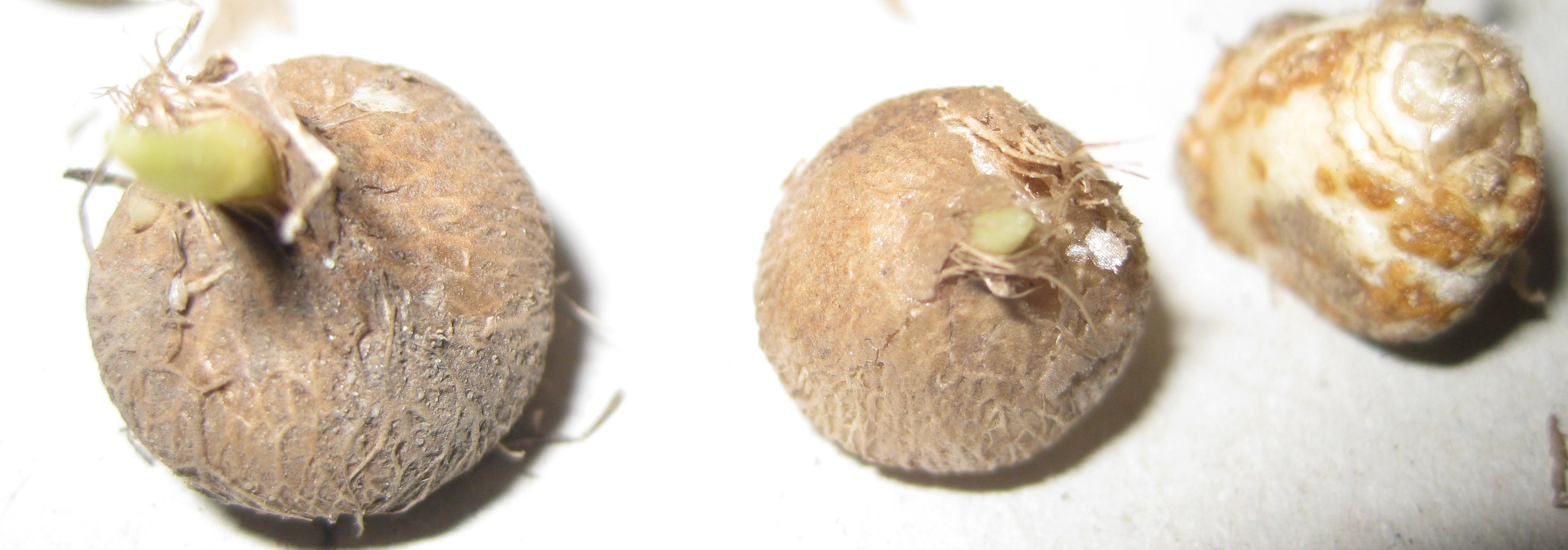
An example of the edible bulbs that are attached to the Brodiaea plant, these have high caloric and carbohydrate content.

Much of what has been revealed about the Paleocoastal peoples lies in the discovery of their diets. Exploration of the Daisy Cave has revealed fish bones and 'macrobotanical food remains' that help scholars understand the structure of the Paleocoastal people's lives and adaptations. Because of their location, the early Channel Islanders boasted an impressive ingenuity when it came to harvesting food; they were perhaps the first peoples to utilize hook-and-line fishing, as well as boating. This evidence comes from the analysis of about "27,000 fish bones... dated between about 11,500 and 8500 cal B.P," which suggests that fish and other marine creatures made up more than half of the Channel Islander diet. From the analysis of these remains, not only did fish make up much of the Channel Islander diet, but there was also a variety of species that the Channel Islanders fished, including "clupeids, surfperch, rockfish, sheephead, flatfish, elasmobranchs, tunas, and other taxa that are essentially the same types of fish captured by late Holocene and ethnographic people in the area." These various fish bones add to the already-established evidence of netting and boat materials to conclude that the Channel Islanders were adept at fishing and making the most of their maritime habitat.

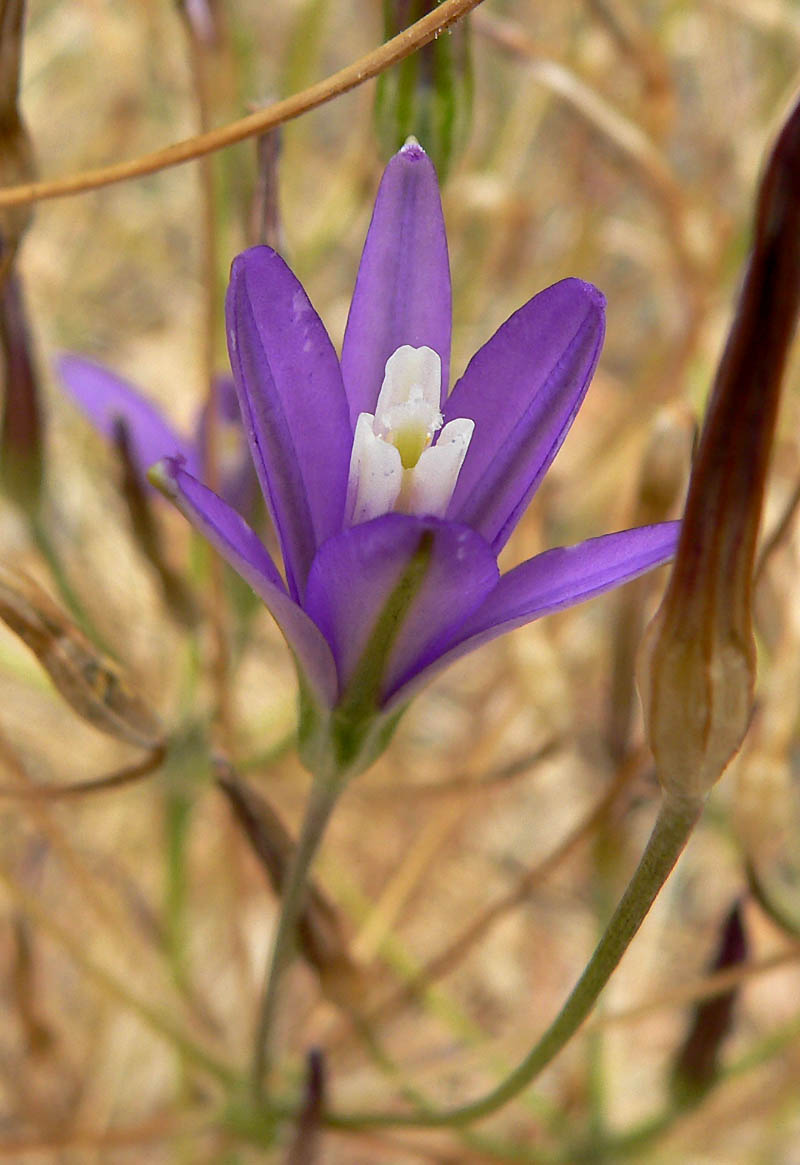
An example of the Brodiaea plant that was found to be abundant on San Miguel Island. This plant is a native to California, but this particular plant may not be the exact species referred to in source.

Despite the Channel Islands being largely considered as lacking in diverse vegetation, evidence has slowly surfaced that suggests the Channel Islanders also used plants to accompany their largely marine diet. The bulk of this knowledge comes from 16 samples extracted during the 1985-86 excavation conducted by Guthrie, Morris, and Snethkamp. The 16 samples "yielded 11 carbonized seeds, 109 fragments of corms and related carbonized remains, and 43 small fragments of manroot." These remains reveal the use of geophytes (perennial plants that bear perennating buds below the surface of the soil) as a food source, also supported by a high nutrient content that would be effective for Channel Islanders, as well as the sheer amount of these plants that grew back as vegetative populations could recover after overgrazing.
