= Tuqan Man =

Human remains found on San Miguel Island, California in 2005

The Tuqan Man consists of human remains found on San Miguel Island off the coast of California in 2005. The skull and bones of a man buried between 9,800 and 10,200 years ago were exposed by beach erosion on this westernmost of the Channel Islands. The remains were encountered and preserved in 2005 by University of Oregon archaeologists. The remains were dated by way of radiocarbon dating and evaluation of artifacts which had been intentionally buried with him. Analysis of the bones indicated that he was in his forties when he died, and had spent time some distance east of what is now the Santa Barbara coastal region. It was not possible to extract the Tuqan Man's DNA, though increasingly better testing techniques and methods became available and were utilized over the 12 years that passed after his original discovery. The remains return to the island was delayed by resolution of tribal identification and ownership issues contingent on resolution of the precedent-setting Kennewick Man case from Washington State. Under procedures in accordance with the Native American Graves Protection and Repatriation Act (NAGPRA), in May, 2018, they were restored to the claiming Chumash tribe, for reburial on the island. The Chumash people had long occupied the island before the arrival of the first European explorers, and the find was given the place name of the island in the Chumash language.

Archaeological research has shown that San Miguel Island was first settled by humans at least 12,000 years ago, when San Miguel was still part of the larger Santarosae Island that connected the northern Channel Islands when sea levels were lower near the end of the Last Glacial period. Because the northern Channel Islands have not been connected to the adjacent mainland in recent geological history, the Paleo-Indians who first settled the island clearly had boats and other maritime technologies. San Miguel was occupied by the ancestors of the Chumash people for many millennia. They had developed a complex and rich maritime culture based on ocean fishing, hunting, and gathering. They called the island Tuquan in the Chumash language. For many centuries, they built and used sophisticated canoes, called tomols, made from sewn planks caulked with asphaltum (bitumen). In tomols, they fished and hunted in island waters and participated in active trade with their neighbors on the other islands and the mainland. A remaining population of a dwarf species descended from Columbian mammoths, were extinct for perhaps three millennia prior to the death of Tuqan Man but existed on the Channel Islands when they were first visited by Paleoindians.
