= USS Reno (DD-303) =

Clemson-class destroyer

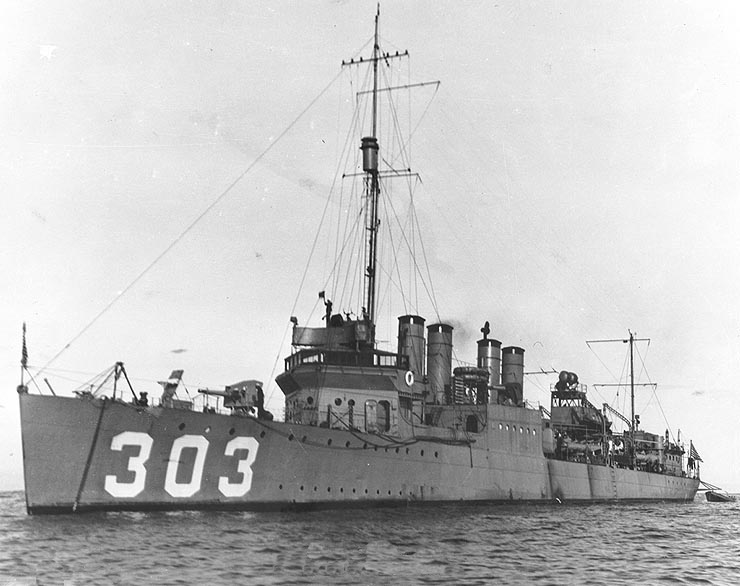
- USS Reno (DD-303)

History

United States
- Namesake: Walter E. Reno
- Builder: Bethlehem Shipbuilding Corporation, Union Iron Works, San Francisco
- Laid down: 4 July 1918
- Launched: 22 January 1919
- Commissioned: 23 July 1920
- Decommissioned: 18 January 1930
- Stricken: 8 July 1930
- Fate: Sold for scrapping, 1931

General characteristics
- Class & type: Clemson-class destroyer
- Displacement: 1,290 long tons (1,311 t) (standard); 1,389 long tons (1,411 t) (deep load)
- Length: 314 ft 4 in (95.8 m)
- Beam: 30 ft 11 in (9.42 m)
- Draught: 10 ft 3 in (3.1 m)
- Installed power: 27,000 shp (20,000 kW); 4 water-tube boilers
- Propulsion: 2 shafts, 2 steam turbines
- Speed: 35 knots (65 km/h; 40 mph) (design)
- Range: 2,500 nautical miles (4,600 km; 2,900 mi) at 20 knots (37 km/h; 23 mph) (design)
- Complement: 6 officers, 108 enlisted men
- Armament: 4 × single 4-inch (102 mm) guns; 2 × single 1-pounder AA guns or; 2 × single 3-inch (76 mm) guns; 4 × triple 21 inch (533 mm) torpedo tubes; 2 × depth charge rails

USS Reno (DD-303) was a Clemson-class destroyer built for the United States Navy during World War I.

== Namesake ==
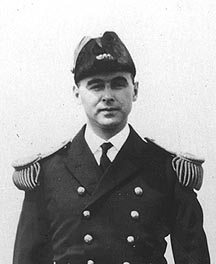
Walter E. Reno

Walter Elsworth Reno was born on 3 October 1881 in Davis County, Iowa. He entered the United States Naval Academy in 1901 and graduated in 1905. While a junior officer, Reno served primarily in battleships. He was promoted to the rank of Lieutenant in 1910 and during the next four years was stationed on the battleships USS New Jersey and USS Wisconsin. From early 1914 until early 1916 he was Officer in Charge at the Chicago, Illinois, Navy Recruiting Station.

Reno was deployed to the Philippines, where he took command of the destroyer USS Chauncey. In mid 1917, after United States had entered World War I, Reno brought his ship from the Far East to the European war zone. While on convoy escort duty west of Gibraltar during the night of 19 November 1917, Chauncey was rammed by British merchantman Rose and sank, taking with her Lieutenant Commander Reno and twenty of his ship's officers and men.

Reno was awarded the Navy Cross "for exceptionally distinguished service in the line of his profession in command of the U.S.S. Chauncey in making the trip of 11,000 miles from Manila, P. I., to Gibraltar, under very unfavorable weather conditions".

== Description ==
The Clemson class was a repeat of the preceding Wickes class although more fuel capacity was added. The ships displaced 1,290 long tons (1,311 t) at standard load and 1,389 long tons (1,411 t) at deep load. They had an overall length of 314 feet 4 inches (95.8 m), a beam of 30 feet 11 inches (9.4 m) and a draught of 10 feet 3 inches (3.1 m). They had a crew of 6 officers and 108 enlisted men.

Performance differed radically between the ships of the class, often due to poor workmanship. The Clemson class was powered by two steam turbines, each driving one propeller shaft, using steam provided by four water-tube boilers. In Reno's case four Yarrow boilers supplied steam to Curtis turbines. The turbines were designed to produce a total of 27,000 shaft horsepower (20,000 kW) intended to reach a speed of 35 knots (65 km/h; 40 mph). The ships carried a maximum of 371 long tons (377 t) of fuel oil which was intended gave them a range of 2,500 nautical miles (4,600 km; 2,900 mi) at 20 knots (37 km/h; 23 mph).

The ships were armed with four 4-inch (102 mm) guns in single mounts and were fitted with two 1-pounder guns for anti-aircraft defense. In many ships a shortage of 1-pounders caused them to be replaced by 3-inch (76 mm) guns. Their primary weapon, though, was their torpedo battery of a dozen 21 inch (533 mm) torpedo tubes in four triple mounts. They also carried a pair of depth charge rails. A "Y-gun" depth charge thrower was added to many ships.

== Construction and career ==
Reno, named for Walter E. Reno, was laid down by the Bethlehem Shipbuilding Corporation, Union Iron Works, San Francisco, 4 July 1918; launched 22 January 1919; sponsored by Miss Kathryn Baldwin Anderson, daughter of former Lieutenant Governor of California Alden Anderson, and commissioned 23 July 1920. Reno's mother, Mrs. L. D. Reno, of Eldon, Iowa was approached to sponsor the ship, but declined due to her health. Reno's widow, Beatrice Tracy Reno, daughter of former assistant secretary of the Navy Frank Tracy, was also considered as a potential sponsor.

Attached to the Pacific Fleet, Reno operated along the west coast until January 1921 when she joined other fleet units in a cruise to Valparaíso, Chile. Resuming west coast operations on her return, she ranged between Washington and Lower California, with occasional runs to Hawaii or the Panama Canal Zone. On the morning of September 8, 1923, while accompanying the destroyers that would become involved in the Honda Point disaster of the same day, Reno found and rescued the survivors of the steamship SS Cuba, who had run aground on a reef just off San Miguel Island off the coast of Santa Barbara County, California. In April 1927 she came as far east as Guantanamo, Cuba, and in July of that year she was at Prince Rupert, British Columbia, to participate in the celebrations of the Canadian Diamond Jubilee.

Decommissioned at San Diego 18 January 1930, Reno was struck from the Navy list 8 July 1930. She was scrapped in 1931, in accordance with the terms of the London Treaty limiting naval armament.
