= Channel Islands (California) =

Archipelago off the coast of southern California, US

Coordinates: 34°00′58″N 119°48′14″W

Channel Islands Spanish: Archipiélago del Norte
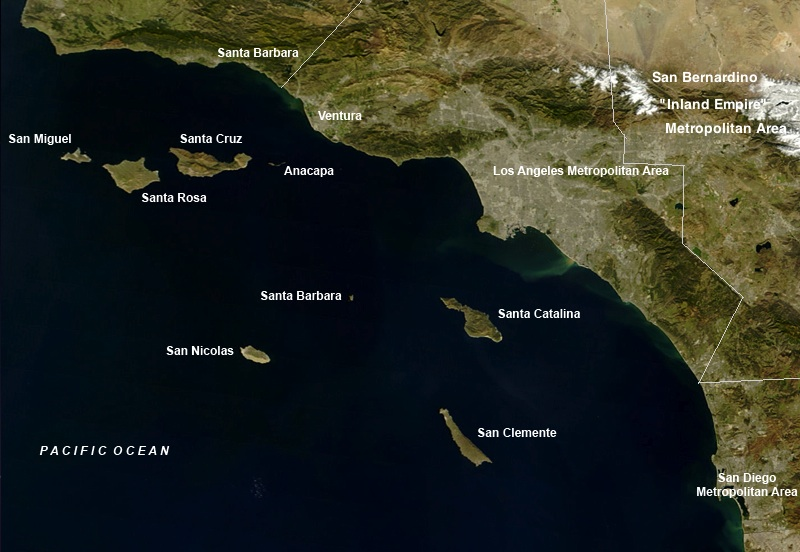

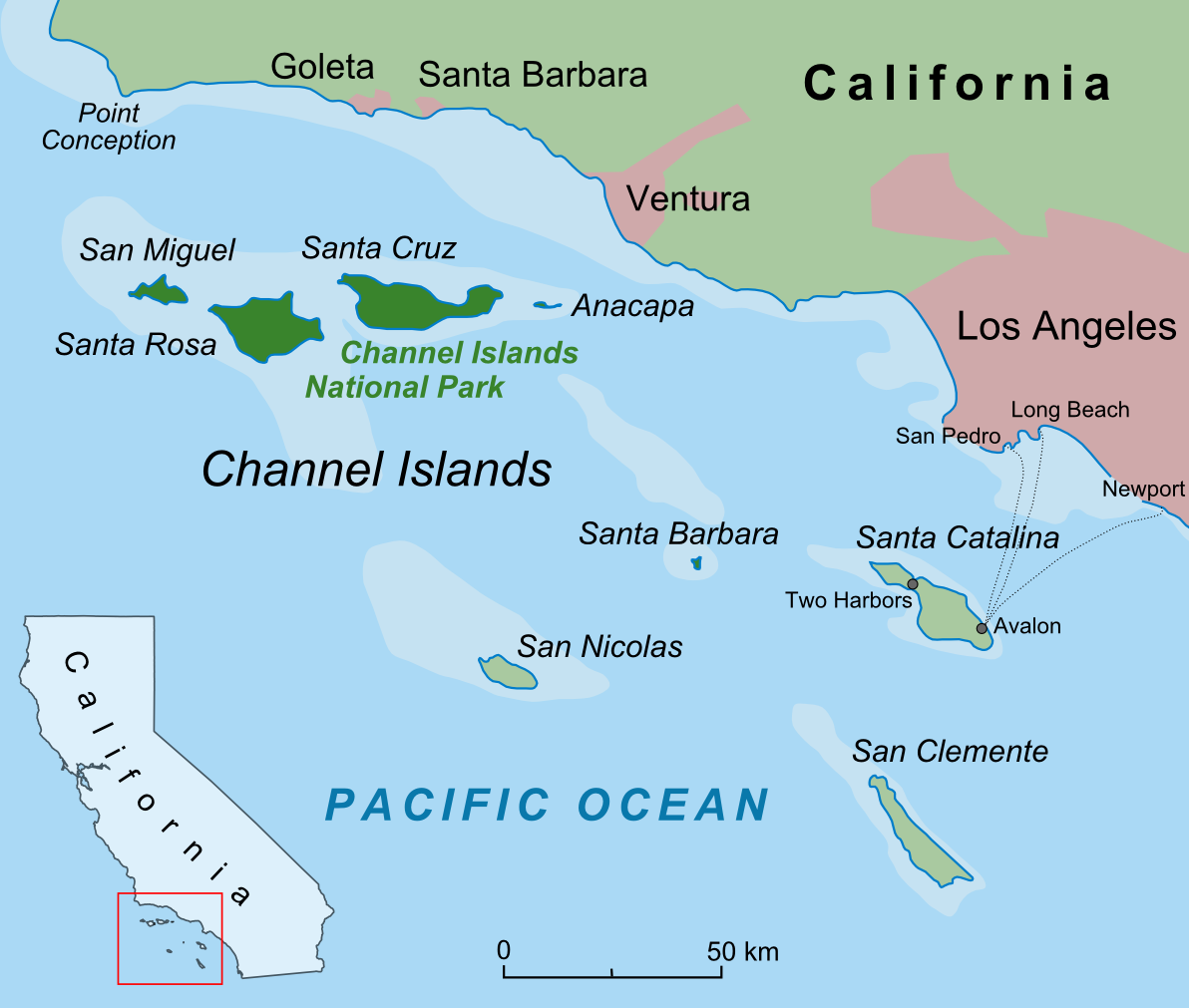

Geography
- Location: Pacific Ocean
- Total islands: 8
- Area: 350.89 sq mi (908.8 km^{2})
- Highest elevation: 2,429 ft (740.4 m)
- Highest point: Devils Peak, Santa Cruz Island

Administration
- United States
- State: California
- Counties: Santa Barbara; Ventura; Los Angeles
- Largest settlement: Avalon (pop. 3,728)

Demographics
- Population: 4,603 (2010)

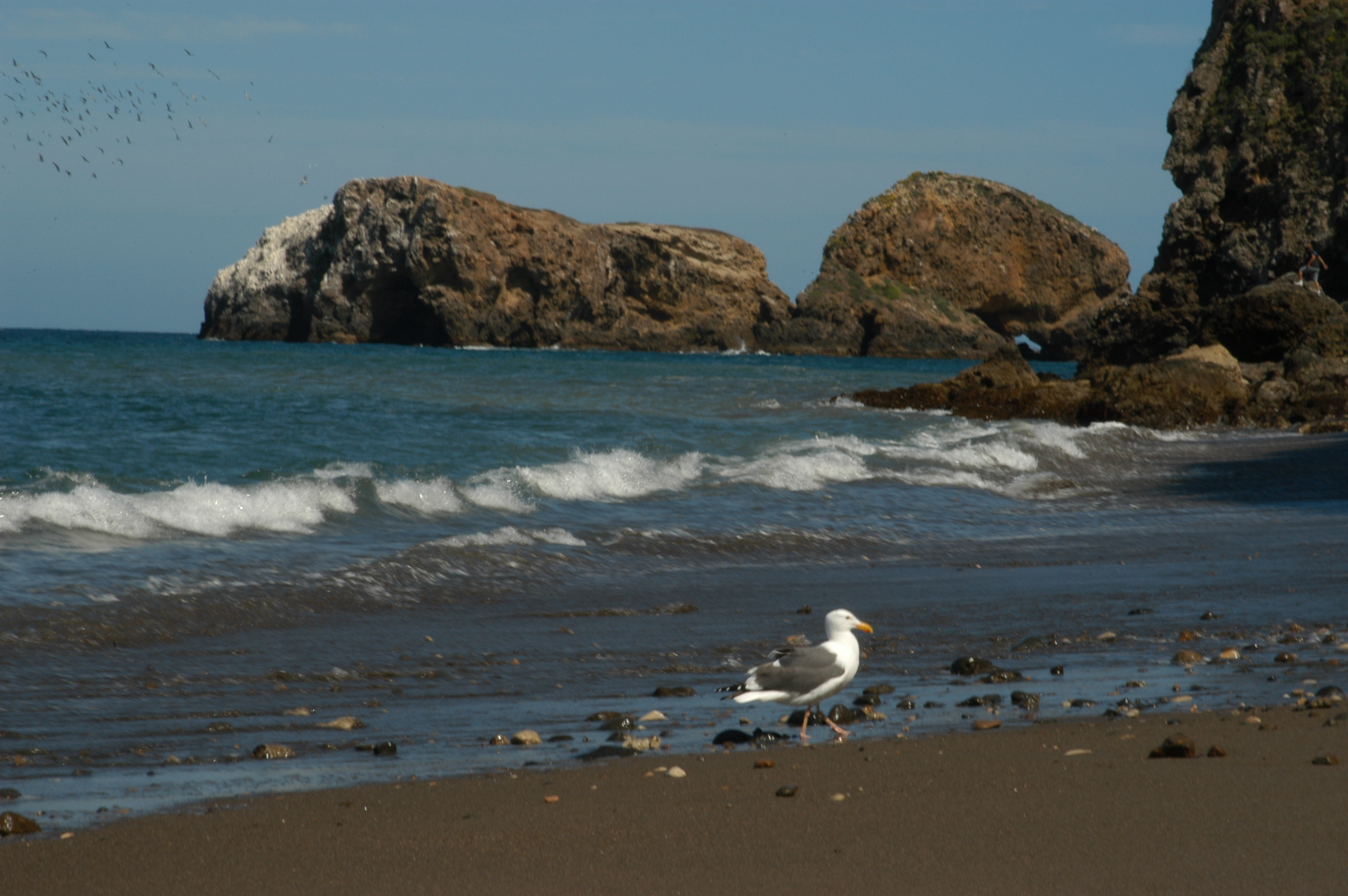
Beach on Santa Cruz Island

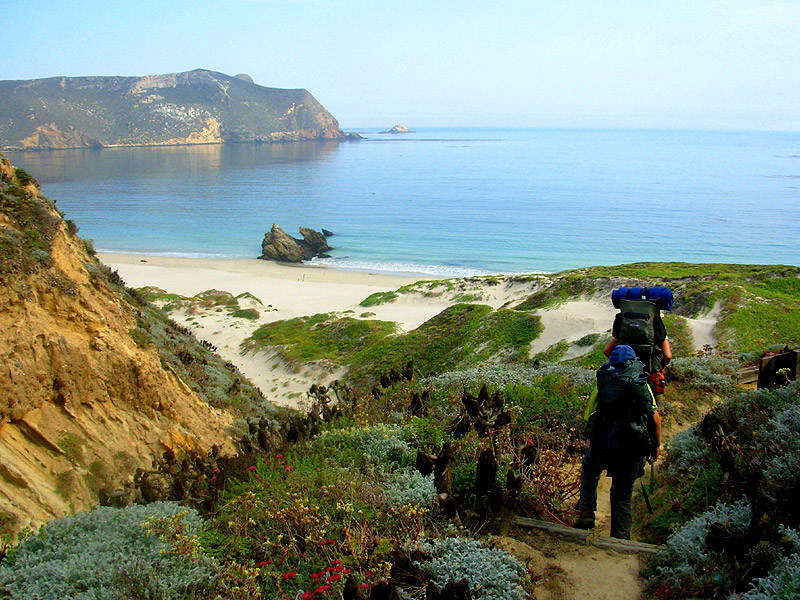
Beach on San Miguel Island

The Channel Islands (Spanish: islas del Canal, Archipiélago del Norte) are an eight-island archipelago located within the Southern California Bight in the Pacific Ocean, off the coast of California. They define the Santa Barbara Channel between the islands and the California mainland.

The four Northern Channel Islands are part of the Transverse Ranges geologic province, and the four Southern Channel Islands are part of the Peninsular Ranges province. Five of the islands are within the Channel Islands National Park. The waters surrounding these islands make up Channel Islands National Marine Sanctuary. The Nature Conservancy was instrumental in establishing the Channel Islands National Marine Sanctuary.

There is evidence that humans have lived on the Northern Channel Islands for thousands of years. Analysis of radiocarbon dating data indicates a continuous human presence starting between 8,000 and 11,000 years ago. The islands were inhabited primarily by two different Native American groups, the Chumash and the Tongva (Gabrieleño). The Channel Islands and the surrounding waters house a diverse ecosystem with many endemic species and subspecies. The islands harbor 150 unique species of plants.

Two of the islands, San Clemente Island and San Nicolas Island, are used by the United States Navy as training grounds, weapons test sites, and strategic defensive locations.

== Characteristics ==
The eight islands are split among the jurisdictions of three California counties: Santa Barbara County (4), Ventura County (2), and Los Angeles County (2). The islands are divided into the Northern Channel Islands and the Southern Channel Islands. The four northern Islands used to be a single landmass known as Santa Rosae.

The archipelago extends for 160 miles (257 km) between San Miguel Island in the north and San Clemente Island in the south. Together, the islands' land area totals 221,331 acres (89,569 ha), or about 346 square miles (900 km^{2}).

Five of the islands (San Miguel, Santa Rosa, Santa Cruz, Anacapa, and Santa Barbara) were made into the Channel Islands National Park in 1980. The Channel Islands National Marine Sanctuary encompasses the waters six nautical miles (11 kilometers; 6.9 miles) off these islands.

Santa Catalina Island is the only one of the eight islands with significant permanent civilian settlements—the resort city of Avalon and the unincorporated community of Two Harbors. University of Southern California also houses its USC Wrigley Institute for Environmental Studies marine lab in Two Harbors.

The Channel Islands National Park mainland visitor center in Ventura Harbor received 342,000 visitors in 2014. The islands attract around 70,000 tourists a year, mostly during the summer. Visitors can travel to the islands by boat or airplane. Camping grounds are available in the Channel Islands National Park in Anacapa, Santa Rosa, Santa Cruz, San Miguel, and Santa Barbara Islands. Attractions include whale watching, hikes, snorkeling, kayaking and camping.

Natural seepage of oil occurs at several places in the Santa Barbara Channel. Tar balls or pieces of tar in small numbers are found in the kelp and on the beaches. Native Americans used naturally occurring tar, bitumen, for various purposes, including roofing, waterproofing, paving, and some ceremonial purposes.

The Channel Islands at low elevations are virtually frost-free and constitute one of the few such areas in the 48 contiguous US states. It snows only rarely on higher mountain peaks.

== Islands ==
The eight Channel Islands of California, off the west coast of North America
| Island | Indigenous Name and Meaning | Area mi^{2} | Area km^{2} | Population Census 2000 | County | Highest peak feet (meters) |
|---|---|---|---|---|---|---|
Northern Channel Islands
| Anacapa | Anyapakh (deception or mirage) | 1.14 | 2.95 | 3 | Ventura | Summit Peak, 930 (283) |
| San Miguel | Tuqan (unknown meaning) | 14.57 | 37.74 | – | Santa Barbara | San Miguel Hill, 831 (253) |
| Santa Cruz | Limuw (place of the sea) | 96.51 | 249.95 | 2 | Santa Barbara | Devils Peak, 2,429 (740) |
| Santa Rosa | Wi'ma (redwood driftwood) | 83.12 | 215.27 | 2 | Santa Barbara | Soledad Peak, 1,589 (484) |
Southern Channel Islands
| San Clemente | Kinkipar | 56.81 | 147.13 | 300^{†} | Los Angeles | Vista Point, 1,965 (599) |
| San Nicolas | Haraasnga | 22.75 | 58.93 | 200^{†} | Ventura | Jackson Hill, 907 (276) |
| Santa Barbara | Tchunashngna | 1.02 | 2.63 | – | Santa Barbara | Signal Hill, 634 (193) |
| Santa Catalina | Pimuu'nga | 74.98 | 194.19 | 4,096 | Los Angeles | Mount Orizaba, 2,123 (648) |
| Channel Islands | | 350.89 | 908.79 | 4,603 | | Devils Peak, 2,429 (740) |
^{†}Navy installations, itinerant military and civilian population

== Geology ==
The Channel Islands consist mainly of sedimentary rock, which lies on a deep platform of volcanic rock. This, in turn, lies atop the eastern margin of the Pacific plate, a large tectonic plate which mostly consists of the oceanic crust underlying the Pacific Ocean but also incorporates the continental crust of California west of the San Andreas Fault. The volcanic rock underlying the islands was laid down in undersea eruptions between 19 and 15 million years ago.

The Channel Islands platform may have been exposed above sea level for a time after its initial formation, as a result of continuous tectonic uplift and volcanic activity. Still, it was quickly eroded below the water line and underwent sediment accumulation for the next 10–14 million years. Much of these sedimentary layers, composed primarily of sandstone, siltstone, and shale, document a prolonged history of mixed marine and terrestrial deposition. Formations such as the Vaqueros Sandstone, Rincon Claystone, and Monterey Shale were deposited during the early to middle Miocene, representing millions of years of both marine and terrestrial (mud and sand) accumulations. During the same period, the ongoing collision of the Pacific plate and the adjacent North American plate caused the Channel Islands platform and adjacent mainland areas to rotate 90 degrees counterclockwise. Paleomagnetic evidence from rocks older than 16 millions years within the Western Transverse Ranges supports this rotation, which resulted in the present east–west orientation of the islands' ridges.

About 5 million years ago, the Channel Islands and the onshore east–west ranges, such as the Santa Monica Mountains, were uplifted as a result of tectonic forces from the collision of the northward-moving Baja California peninsula—attached to the Pacific plate—with the North American plate. Compression of the rocks lifted the islands above sea level in a process of folding and faulting that continues today.

Since the uplift began, the extent of the islands has varied with sea levels. During ice ages, when the water line was hundreds of feet lower than today, more land was exposed, and several islands were effectively joined into a single large island. Conversely, less of the land was exposed when sea levels were higher, and shorelines formed at higher levels. Historically, the Palos Verdes Hills was once one of the Channel Islands (San Pedro Island) when sea levels were higher. Evidence for ancient shorelines at higher sea levels is visible today as marine terraces along the islands' slopes. Undersea exploration has found evidence of lower shorelines below today's sea level.

== History ==
Separated from the California mainland throughout recent geological history, the Channel Islands provide the earliest evidence for human seafaring in North America. The northern Channel Islands are now known to have been settled by maritime Paleo-Indian peoples at least 13,000 years ago.

The Arlington Springs Man was discovered in 1960 at Arlington Springs on Santa Rosa Island. The remains were dated to 13,000 years BP.

The Tuqan Man was discovered on San Miguel Island in 2005. His remains were exposed by beach erosion and were preserved by University of Oregon archeologists. His age was determined to be about 10,000 years.

Archeological sites on the island provide an invaluable record of human interaction with Channel Island marine and terrestrial ecosystems from the late Pleistocene to historic times. The Anacapa Island Archeological District is a 700-acre (280 ha) historic district that was listed on the National Register of Historic Places (NRHP) in 1979.

=== Indigenous peoples ===
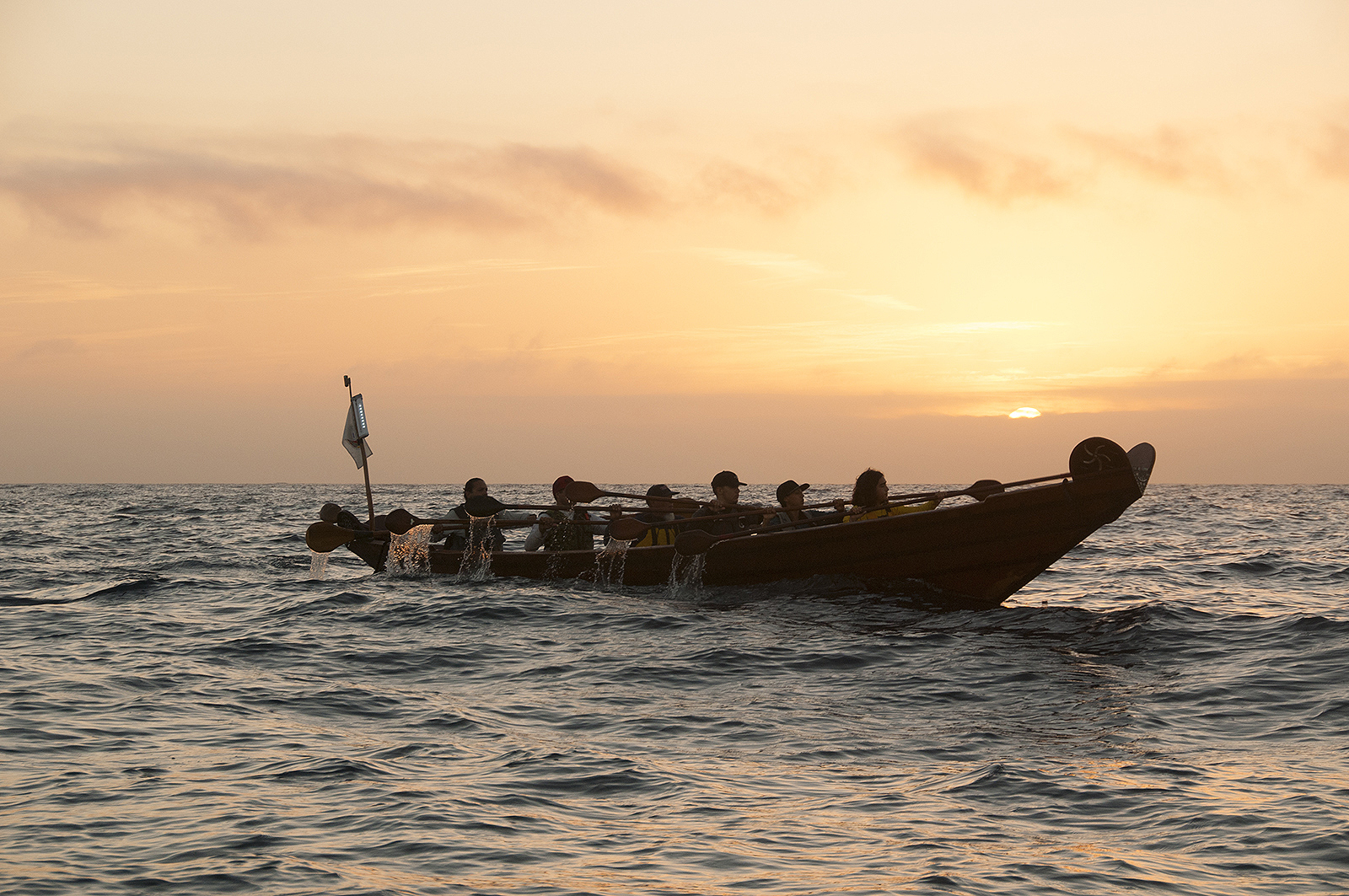
Tomols or te'aats are Chumash and Tongva boats used to travel throughout the islands and to the mainland.

Historically, the northern islands were occupied by the Chumash, while the southern islands were occupied by the Tongva.

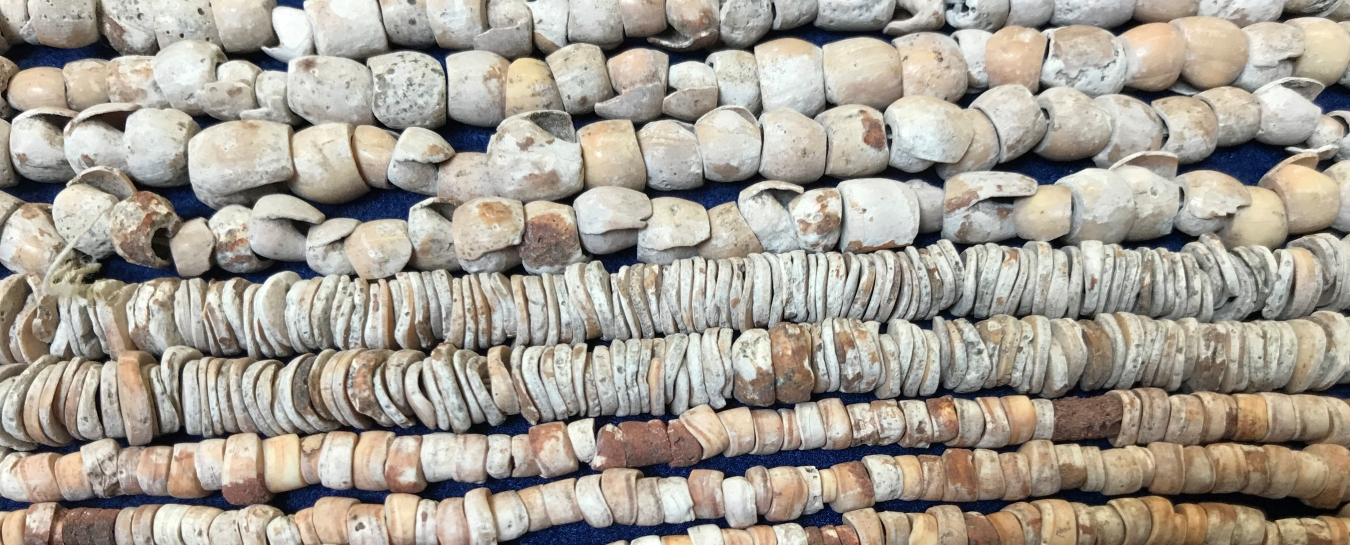
The Chumash people made shell beads to fuel their economy. They were used as trading items to gain food and material goods from the mainland.

The earliest known Chumash village site is on Santa Rosa Island. It belongs to the period around 7,500 BP. The Chumash people lived in large villages or towns with up to 1,000 residents. Chumash villages typically contained houses and sweat lodges and occasionally had menstrual houses, cemeteries, sacred spaces, and structures for food storage and preparation. The Chumash people were leaders in the creation of their villages, they had a sociopolitical organization that allowed their villages to be so well preserved and created great social space and village community that lasted even into an excavation of their villages. Soon after, the population density on the islands began to rise. A significant increase in fish and marine mammal exploitation has been observed. The Tongva people used many marine artifacts in their daily lives, such as shells. They used shells to create beads, and while this was not part of their dietary practices, it was a vital part of their economy. They used these shell beads to trade to obtain more food from the mainland that they could not cultivate on the island.

Around 2,500 BP (500 BC), there was a significant evolution in technology and increasing reliance on fishing. The circular shell fishhooks were increasingly used. Mortars and pestles were manufactured on San Miguel Island for trade with the mainland. The middens in San Miguel Island showed some of the earliest known fishing hooks and specialized tools for processing seafood. Archaeologists on site CA-SMI-608 found various tools made from chipped stone, bone tools, and beads.

A new type of boat created by the Chumash known as tomol and by the Tongva as te'aats, appeared on the islands around 1,500 BP (500 AD). The boat had become a critical part of Chumash and Tongva culture by 650 AD. The tomol boats were highly sophisticated boats that were able to transport multiple families across the islands which were valuable to the culture of the Chumash people. The boats were made from tule which made the boats very buoyant and unsinkable.

=== Modern history ===
==== The Nicoleño ====
The Nicoleño was a Uto-Aztecan Native American people group living on San Nicolas Island in California. The population was "left devastated by a massacre in 1811 by sea otter hunters". The group's last surviving member was named Juana Maria, born before 1811 and died in 1853. Juana Maria, better known to history as the "Lone Woman of San Nicolas Island" (her native name is unknown), lived alone on San Nicolas Island from 1835 until her removal from the island in early September 1853, when men discovered her inside a hut made of whalebones and brush. Arrived on California's mainland, Juana Maria's fondness for green corn, vegetables, and fresh fruit caused severe attacks of dysentery. In her weakness, she fell from Nidever's porch and injured her spine. On Oct. 18, 1853, only seven weeks after arriving on the mainland, she died of dysentery in Garey, California, at age 43. Before she died, Father Sanchez baptized and christened her with the Spanish name Juana Maria. She was buried in an unmarked grave on the Nidever family plot at the Santa Barbara Mission cemetery.

Aleut hunters visited the islands to hunt otters in the early 1800s. The Aleuts purportedly clashed with the native Chumash, killing many over trading disputes. Aleut interactions with the natives were detailed in Scott O'Dell's novel Island of the Blue Dolphins which described the indigenous peoples living on the island.

The Chumash and Tongva were removed from the islands in the early 19th century and taken to Spanish missions and pueblos on the adjacent mainland. The Channel Islands were then used primarily for ranching and fishing for a century. Several of the islands were used by whalers in the 1930s to hunt for sperm whales. This had significant impacts on island ecosystems, including the local extinction of sea otters, bald eagles, and other established species. For example, the decline in the local otter population led to the population growth of their prey, the black abalone. As a result, the Channel Islands became an essential stop in the 1850s for Chinese-American fishermen who harvested the abalone and exported them to Hong Kong.

==== Conservation ====
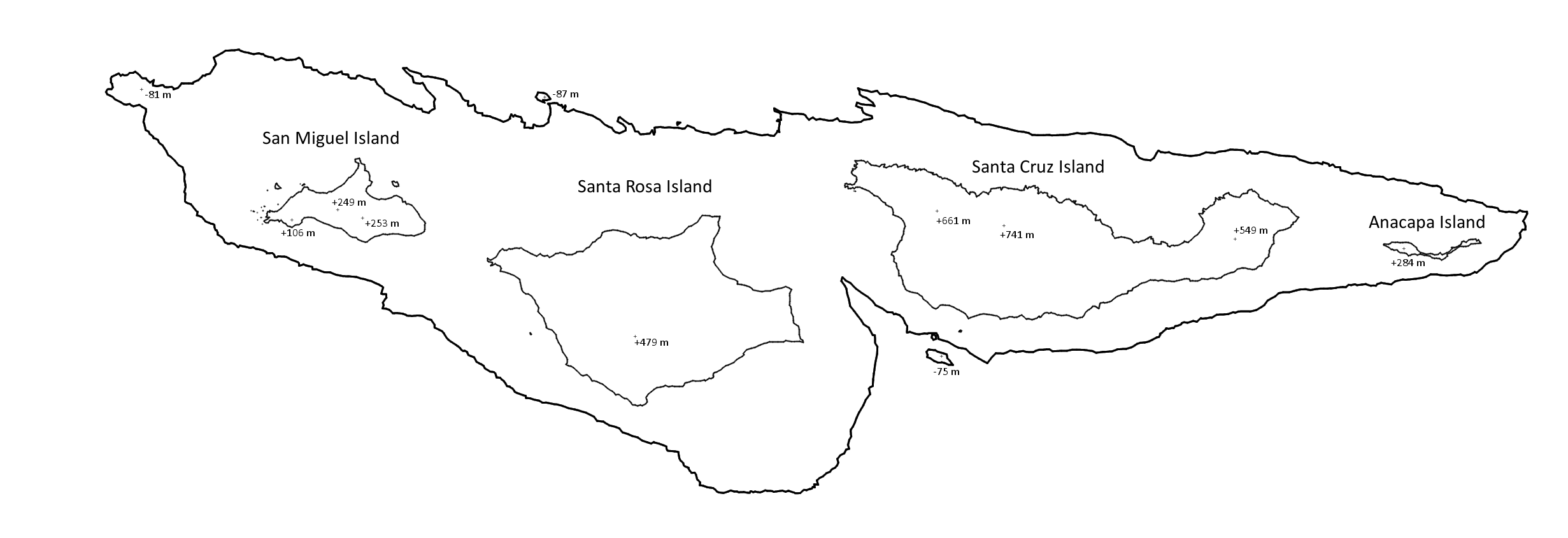
An approximate map of the Channel Islands' land extent roughly 14,000 years ago, showing their historical connection to each other. While they are currently separated from mainland California by a 230 meters (750 feet) deep channel, at this point in history they were only 7.8 kilometers (4.8 miles) from the mainland compared to the modern 19 kilometers (12 miles), making prehistoric travel from mainland to them and between them much easier.

As most of the Channel Islands are now managed by federal agencies or conservation groups who made significant progresses to restore its former wilderness and ecosystem. The population of local bald eagle threatened due to DDT contamination is now recovering. Similarly, scientists from the USC Wrigley Institute for Environmental Studies supported conservation of the Catalina Island Fox, its population rebounding from a lowest of around 100 foxes to 1,500 foxes in 2018.

==== Territorial disputes ====
Occasional discussion on the status of the islands has arisen because they (and the Farallon Islands) were not explicitly mentioned in the Treaty of Guadalupe Hidalgo, which ceded northern Mexico to the United States. Citing these perceived legal ambiguities, settlers created unrecognized Micronations in at least two cases. A 1944 review by the Mexican government concluded that it had no claim to them, and a 1978 maritime treaty with the U.S. formally closed the issue.

In 1972, in "a bit of political theater", twenty-six Brown Berets sailed to Catalina Island on tourist boats, set up a small encampment near the town of Avalon, put up a Mexican flag, and claimed the island on behalf of all Chicanos, citing the Treaty of Guadalupe Hidalgo. Twenty-four days later, sheriff's deputies took everyone back to the mainland.

==== Military use ====
The United States Navy controls San Nicolas Island and San Clemente Island, and has installations elsewhere in the chain. During World War II all of southern California's Channel Islands were put under military control, including the civilian-populated Santa Catalina where tourism was halted and established residents needed permits to travel to and from the mainland. San Miguel Island was used as a bombing range and Santa Barbara Island as an early warning outpost under the presumed threat of a Japanese attack on California. San Clemente Island was used to train the Navy's first amphibious force to prepare for Pacific combat against the Japanese in World War II. San Nicolas Island has been used since 1957 as a launch pad for research rockets. Santa Rosa Island was used in 1952 as a base for the USAF 669th AC&W Squadron and they operated two Distant Early Warning FPS-10 radars from the hilltops there. In 1955 another FPS-3 search radar was added, and in 1956, a GPS-3 search radar was installed. A new MPS-14 long-range height-finder radar was installed in 1958. The base was shut down in March 1963, when the 669th was moved to Vandenberg AFB near Lompoc, California. The islands still house US Navy SEALs training facilities, including Naval Auxiliary Landing Field San Clemente Island.

== Wildlife ==
The Channel Islands form part of one of the richest marine ecosystems of the world. Many unique species of plants and animals are endemic to the Channel Islands, including fauna such as the Channel Islands spotted skunk, ashy storm-petrel, and flora including a unique subspecies of Torrey pine.

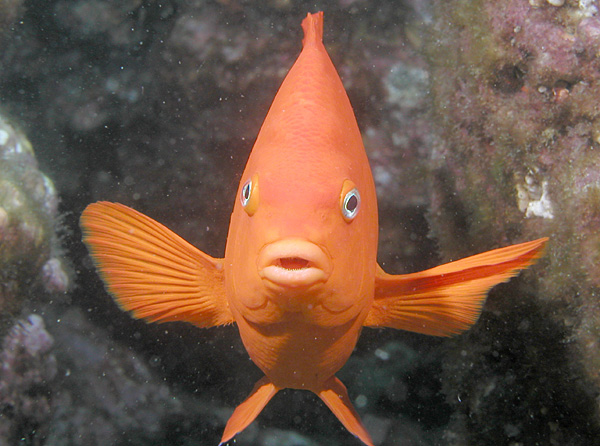
Garibaldi, Catalina Island

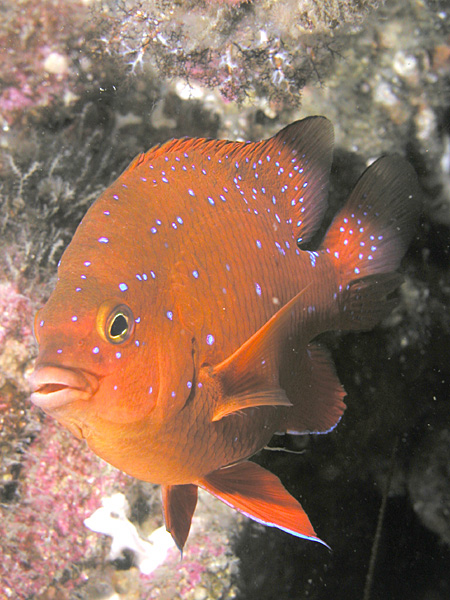
Juvenile Garibaldi, Catalina Island

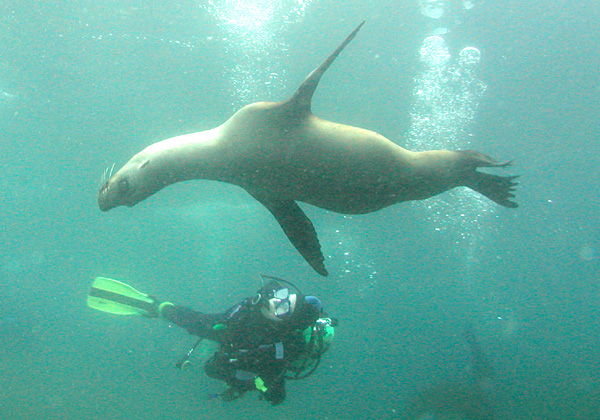
Diver and juvenile sea lion, Anacapa Island

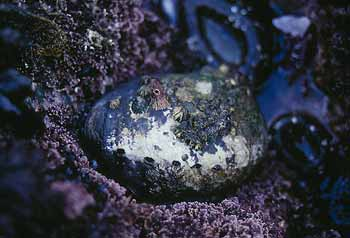
Haliotis cracherodii

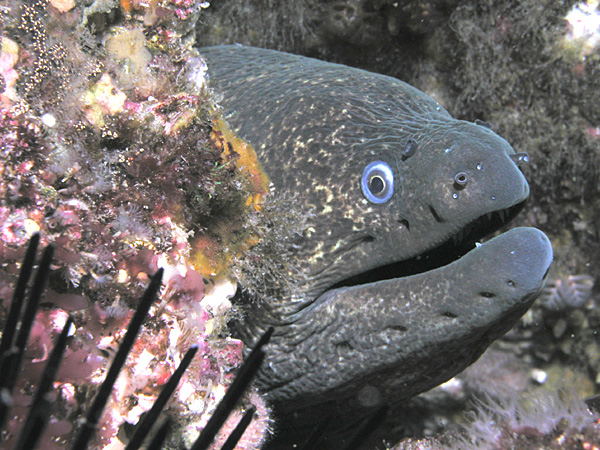
California moray eel

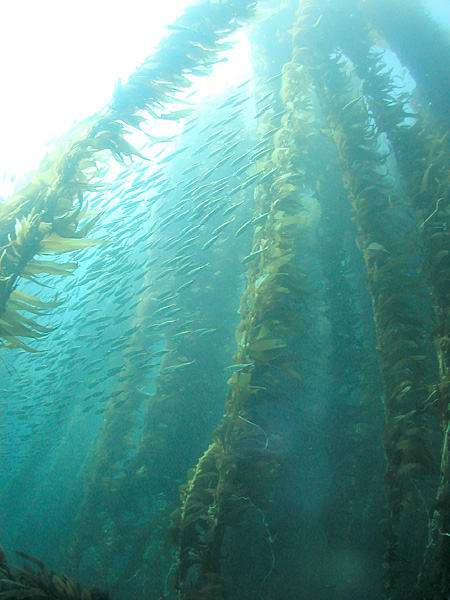
Kelp forest and sardines

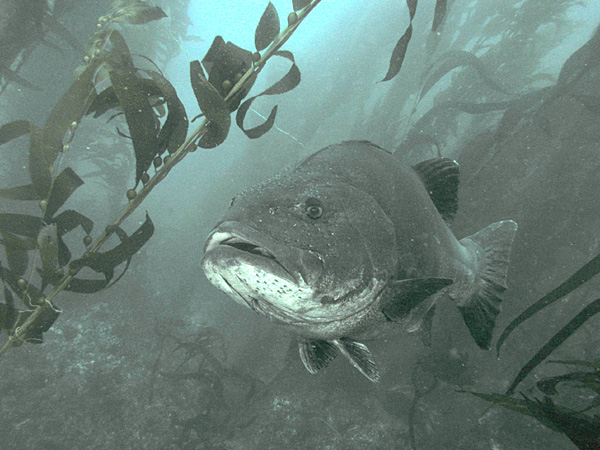
Giant black sea bass, San Clemente Island

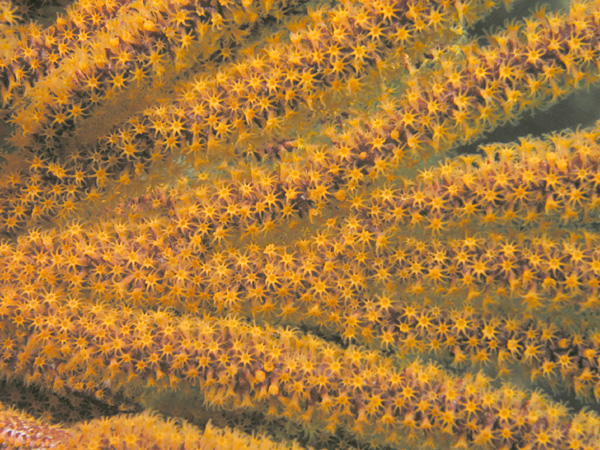
Sea fan, Anacapa Island

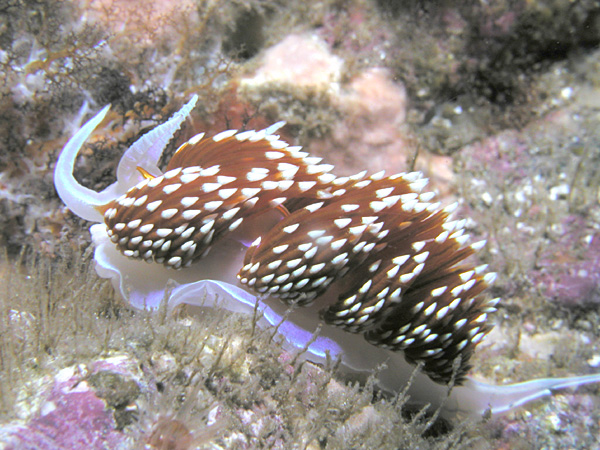
Hermissenda crassicornis, San Clemente Island

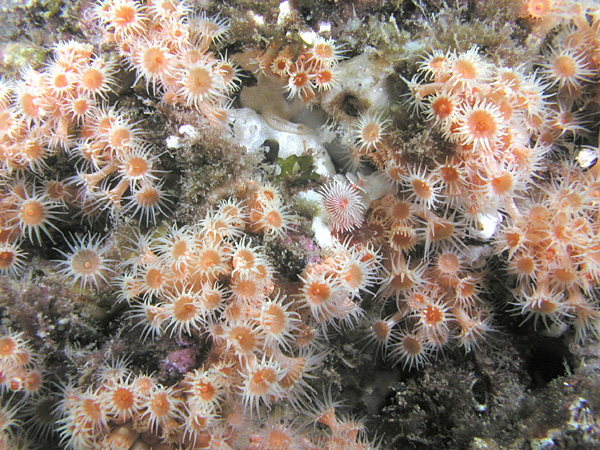
Anemones, Catalina Island

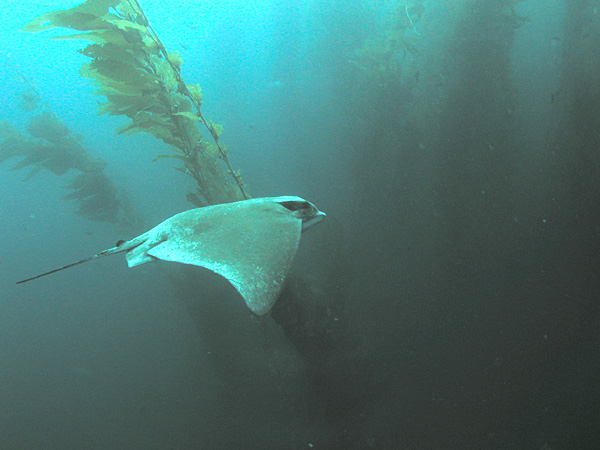
Bat ray in kelp forest, San Clemente Island

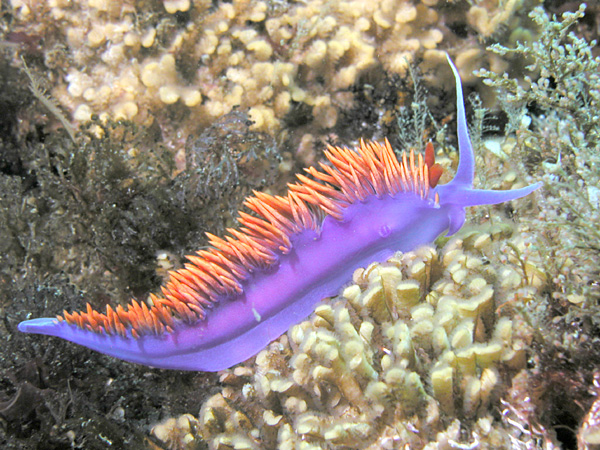
Spanish shawl nudibranch

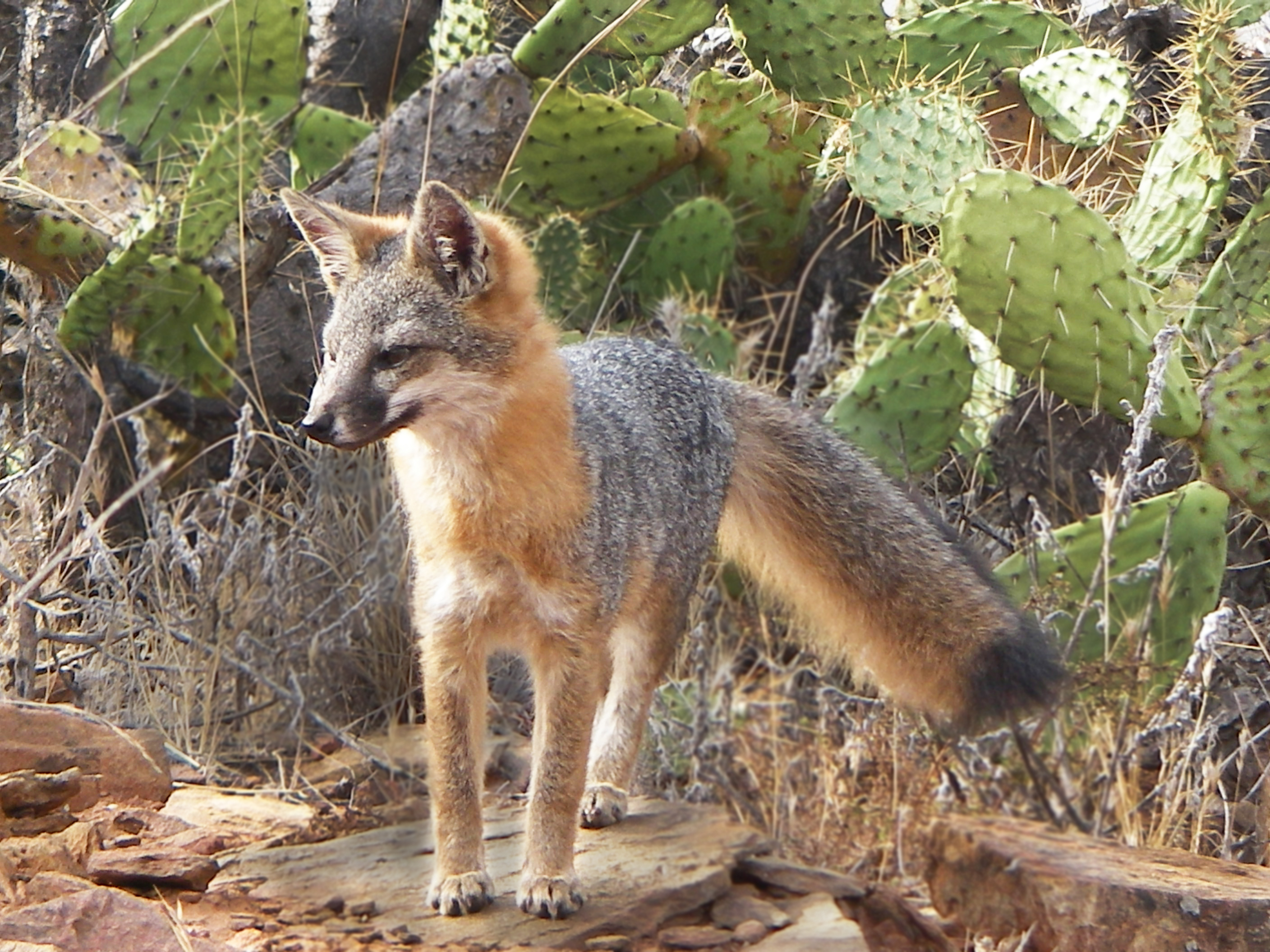
A Catalina Island fox.

=== Flora ===
Flora on the Channel Islands include a unique subspecies of pine, oak, and the island tree mallow. Santa Rosa Island holds two groves of the Torrey pine subspecies Pinus torreyana var. insularis, which is endemic to the island. Torrey pines are the United States' rarest pine species. The islands also house many rare and endangered species of plants, including the island barberry, the island rushrose, and the Santa Cruz Island lace pod. Giant kelp forests surround the islands and act as a source of nutrition and protection for other animals.

Invasive species, such as the Australian blue gum tree, olive tree, sweet fennel, and Harding grass, threaten native species through competition for light, nutrients, and water. The Australian blue gum, for example, releases toxins in its leaf litter which prevents other species of plants from growing in the soil surrounding it. The blue gum, as well as other species including the Harding grass, are much more flammable and better adapted to wildfires than native species. Earthworms, thought to have come from mainland topsoil imported for road construction, are altering the unique ecosystem and microbial communities on San Clemente Island, threatening biodiversity. In this formerly earthworm-free region, they change the distribution of plants and vegetation, making it possible for non-native plants to invade.

=== Fauna ===
The Channel Islands and the waters surrounding hold many endemic species of animals, including fauna such as the Channel Islands spotted skunk, island scrub jay, ashy storm-petrel, San Clemente loggerhead shrike, and the San Clemente sage sparrow. Two breeds of livestock, the Santa Cruz sheep and the San Clemente Island goat originate from here. Many species of large marine mammals, including pacific gray whales, blue whales, humpback whales, and California sea lions breed or feed close to the Channel Islands. Current occurrences of the critically endangered North Pacific right whales and historically abundant Steller's sea lions in these areas are unknown. Seabirds, including the western gulls, bald eagles, pigeon guillemots, and Scripps's murrelets use the islands as well for shelter and breeding grounds. The endemic island fox is California's smallest natural canine and has rebounded from its near extinction in the late 1990s. Several endemic reptile and amphibian species including the island fence lizard, island night lizard, and Channel Islands slender salamander live on the islands. During the Late Pleistocene a dwarf mammoth species, the pygmy mammoth inhabited the northern Channel Islands, before becoming extinct around 13,000 years ago, around the time of human arrival to the Channel Islands. The Channel Islands also had a huge population of shellfish during this time that every part of utilized. The abalone was so important the native peoples started to farm abalone based to get a higher yield

== Conservation ==
=== Terrestrial ===
Terrestrial conservation efforts are being made to maintain the islands' endemic species. Feral livestock, including pigs, goats, and sheep, pose a threat to many of the species, including the San Clemente loggerhead shrike and Channel Islands spotted skunk. The National Park Service eradicated the feral pigs on Santa Rosa and Santa Cruz islands during the 1990s and on Santa Catalina Island in 2007. Introduced pathogens have devastated island species due to isolation from the mainland. In 1998, an outbreak of canine distemper swept through Santa Catalina Island severely reducing the island skunk and fox populations. Rabies and distemper vaccination programs were initiated to protect the island's wildlife. Canine distemper is thought to have been brought to the islands on a stowaway raccoon or a domestic dog.

In the 1950s, bald eagles and peregrine falcons on the Channel Islands became locally extinct after widespread use of pesticides such as DDT. The birds ingest contaminated fish and seabirds which poisons the adults and weakens their eggs. Golden eagles, which are natural competitors of other birds of prey, do not primarily feed on these animals and were able to colonize the islands in the early 1990s. In the early 2000s, golden eagles were live trapped and relocated. In 2002 and 2006 breeding pairs of bald eagles were reintroduced to the northern islands. Later in 2006, the introduced adult eagles hatched chicks on the islands for the first time since their extinction. The Channel Islands National Park established a bald eagle webcam on their website in 2007.

=== Marine ===
The California Channel Islands Marine Sanctuary consists of thirteen Marine Protected Areas (MPAs) around the five islands of the Channel Islands National Park. Combined, these smaller thirteen zones are 124,676 acres (50,455 ha) in size. Eleven of the zones are no-take and harvest areas and the remaining two marine conservation areas allow limited take of lobster and pelagic fish. Although there is a no-take policy, tourists are allowed to visit and observe the beautiful biodiversity. There are several restrictions that limit the type and weight of gear tourists are allowed to bring including transportation–only park/private boats or planes are permitted to enter, fuel transportation, etc. In order to enforce these restrictions and preserve the MPA, the Channel Island National Marine Sanctuary Advisory Council is in charge of state waters including hiring employees and park workers. The federal waters remain under the control and protection of National Oceanic and Atmospheric Administration (NOAA). The California Channel Islands Marine Sanctuary has been moderately successful as shown in a ten-year study done by the Partnership for Interdisciplinary Studies of Coastal Oceans (PISCO). From years 2003–2013, the MPA network implemented caused fish species to increase in biomass in terms of both size, numbers, and weight per area. This increase in fish population was seen both in the MPA and as spillover in the regions outside of these thirteen zones. Given the most recent General Management Plan, passed in April 2015, this MPA will continue to be monitored and protected for the next twenty to forty years in hopes of continuing its successful pattern of restoring biodiversity. Due to Black Abalone (Haliotis Cracherodii) being native species to the Channel Islands being overly harvested, their populations are now low making them an endangered species by the National Oceanic and Atmospheric Administration (NOAA) Fisheries since October 2011.

== In popular culture ==
- "26 Miles (Santa Catalina)" is a 1957 pop song by The Four Preps about Santa Catalina Island. The song has been used in tourism advertisements and the 2018 film Bad Times at the El Royale.
- Aerial combat scenes for the 1970s television show Black Sheep Squadron were filmed above and around the islands.
- Some scenes for the season three finale of American crime drama Bosch were set on Santa Cruz Island. Filming occurred on Santa Catalina Island.
- Scott O'Dell's novel for young adults titled Island of the Blue Dolphins is based on the story of a Nicoleño woman living alone on one of the remote Channel Islands in the 19th century.
- The Glass Bottom Boat, which takes place on Santa Catalina Island, is a 1966 romantic comedy starring Doris Day and Rod Taylor.
- Catalina Caper, which takes place on Santa Catalina Island, is a 1967 beach party/heist movie starring Tommy Kirk and featuring Little Richard.
- San Miguel is a 2012 historical novel by T. C. Boyle about two separate attempts by families to operate commercial livestock ranches on the northern island of San Miguel, one in the late 19th century and the other in the mid-20th.
- The Channel Islands archipelago was featured in text and photographs by Rose Kennedy Schlossberg for the debut issue of Revue Passager.

== See also ==
- Guadalupe Island and the Coronado Islands of Baja California, Mexico share the California chaparral and woodlands ecoregion with the Channel Islands
- Dwarf elephant on the Channel Islands of California
- List of islands of California
