= SS Cuba (1920) =

Passenger steamship that was wrecked in 1923

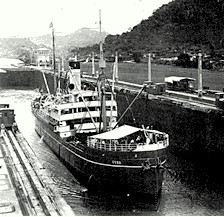
- The ship as Cuba

History
- Name: 1897: Coblenz; 1917: Sachem; 1920: Cuba
- Namesake: 1897: Koblenz; 1917: Sachem; 1920: Cuba
- Owner: 1897: Norddeutscher Lloyd; 1917: US Shipping Board; 1920: Pacific Mail SS Co
- Port of registry: 1897: (German Empire) Bremen; 1917: (United States) San Francisco
- Route: 1897: Bremen – Santos; 1903: Bremen – Manzanillo; 1909: Sydney – Kobe; 1920: San Francisco – Havana; 1923: San Francisco – Cristóbal
- Builder: Blohm+Voss, Hamburg
- Yard number: 121
- Launched: 18 March 1897
- Completed: 5 May 1897
- Identification: 1897: code letters QGJW; 1917: US official number 215771; 1917: code letters NFKJ; 1921: code letters LHTM
- Fate: Wrecked, 1923

General characteristics
- Type: passenger and cargo ship
- Tonnage: 3,169 GRT, 2,001 NRT
- Length: 306.0 ft (93.3 m)
- Beam: 42.0 ft (12.8 m)
- Depth: 23.6 ft (7.2 m)
- Decks: 2
- Installed power: 280 NHP
- Propulsion: 2 × triple-expansion engines; 2 × screws
- Speed: 11 1/2 knots (21 km/h)
- Capacity: passengers: 1897: 20 × 1st class; 232 × 3rd class; 1909: 24 × 1st class; 32 × 2nd class; 68 × 3rd class
- Crew: 54
- Notes: sister ships: Mainz, Trier

SS Cuba was a passenger and cargo steamship that was wrecked in 1923 off the coast of California. Her remains are now a wreck diving site. She was launched in Germany in 1897 as Coblenz for Norddeutscher Lloyd (NDL), which owned and operated her until the United States seized her in 1917. The United States Shipping Board took possession of her and renamed her Sachem. In 1920 the Pacific Mail Steamship Company bought her and renamed her Cuba.

== Building ==
In 1897 NDL took delivery of a trio of sister ships for its route between Bremen and South America. Blohm+Voss in Hamburg launched Coblenz on 18 March, and completed her on 5 May. Joh. C. Tecklenborg in Bremerhaven launched Mainz on 15 May, and completed her on 8 July. Schichau Seebeckwerft in Bremerhaven launched Trier on 5 June, and completed her on 15 June.

Coblenz's registered length was 306.0 ft (93.3 m), her beam was 42.0 ft (12.8 m) and her depth was 23.6 ft (7.2 m). Her tonnages were 3,169 GRT and 2,001 NRT. As built, she had berths for 20 passengers in First Class and 232 in Third Class.

Mainz had twin screws, each driven by a three-cylinder triple-expansion engine the combined power of her twin engines was rated at 280 NHP, and gave her a speed of 11 1/2 knots (21 km/h).

== NDL service ==
NDL registered Coblenz at Bremen. Her code letters were QGJW. In May 1897 she began her maiden voyage, which was to Santos in Brazil. In September 1900 she made a voyage from Bremen to Baltimore. In 1903 NDL put Coblenz, Mainz, and Trier on its route between Bremen and Manzanillo, Cuba. Ports of call on this route were Antwerp; A Coruña; Vilagarcía de Arousa or Vigo; Havana; and Cienfuegos.

In 1909 NDL revised Coblenz's passenger accommodation to 24 First Class; 32 Second Class; and 68 Third Class, and transferred her to its route between Sydney and Kobe. On her first voyage on the route, she left Hong Kong on 13 August, and reached Sydney on 5 September. Ports of call on this route were Brisbane; Rabaul; Friedrich-Wilhelms-Hafen; Maron (Hermit Islands, alternate voyages); Yap; Angaur (alternate voyages); Manila; and Hong Kong. On this route she proved more satisfactory than NDL's Prinz Waldemar and Prinz Sigismund, so the German Government made her a Reichspostdampfer ("State Post Steamer").

On 25 July 1914 Coblenz left Sydney for Kobe as normal, and called at Brisbane two days later. She was in passage from Brisbane to Rabaul on the eve of the First World War, when the German Government ordered all German merchant ships to take refuge in the nearest German or neutral port. Coblenz increased speed, reached Rabaul, and there disembarked all her passengers. From there she made for Manila, as the United States and its colonies were neutral.

== Seizure by the US ==
By 1917 Coblenz was one of 17 German merchant ships in Manila. On 3 February that year the US Government detained German ships in all ports of the US and its colonies.

On 6 April 1917 the USA declared war on Germany, and the US Government seized all the German ships that had been detained since February. The United States Shipping Board (USSB) assumed ownership of Coblenz. In September 1917 it was reported that the Pacific Mail Steamship Company had chartered three of the German ships seized in Manila: NDL's Coblenz, Princess Alice; and Tübingen.

By 1918 the USSB had renamed the ship Sachem, and her official number was 215771. By 1919 she was registered in San Francisco, her code letters were NFKJ, and she was equipped with wireless telegraphy.

== Pacific Mail service and loss ==
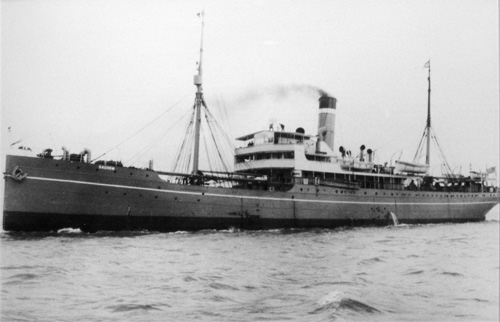
The ship as Sachem

On 6 February 1920, Pacific Mail bought Sachem from the USSB for $400,000. She was renamed Cuba, and her code letters were changed to LHTM. Pacific Mail put her on its route between San Francisco and Havana via the Panama Canal. Later it shortened Cuba's route to San Francisco – Cristóbal, on the Atlantic end of the canal.

In September 1923 Cuba had been navigating through a dense fog for several days. At 04:30 hrs on the morning of 8 September she struck a reef at position 34°01′55″N 120°27′14″W, just off San Miguel Island in the Santa Barbara Channel off Point Arguello of Santa Barbara County, California. Her wireless was not working, and her No. 1, No. 2, and No. 3 holds were flooded. The Chief Officer and eight crewmen set out in one of her lifeboats to seek help. Another 68 of Cuba's passengers and crew then set out in two more lifeboats. Her Master, Purser, and eight seamen remained aboard to guard her cargo, which included $2.5 million in silver bullion.

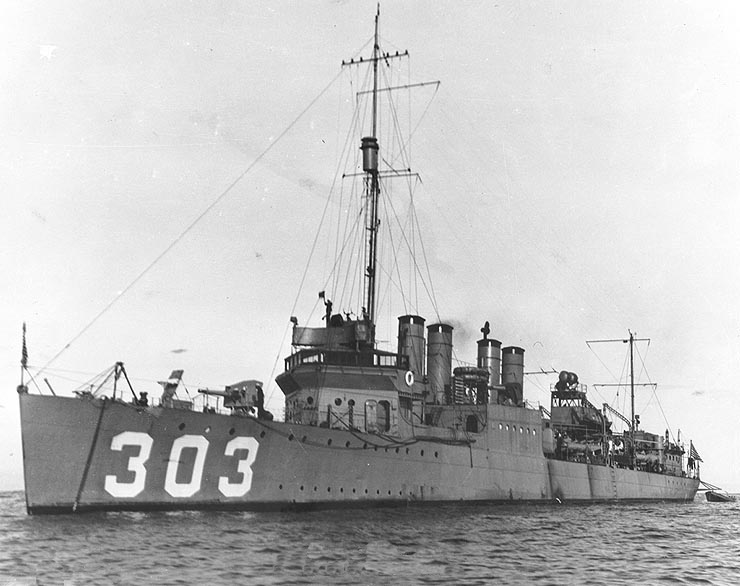
USS Reno

Despite the fog, a squadron of United States Navy destroyers was in the area undertaking a speed trial. One of the destroyers, USS Reno, changed course because of the fog. At about 15:00 hrs, Reno passed one of Cuba's lifeboats at speed. After 3 nautical miles (5.6 km) Reno passed a second lifeboat, and turned back. She rescued all the occupants of the two boats, who included women and children passengers. The survivors then directed Reno to Cuba's wreck.

At first, the Chief Officer and eight men who had left Cuba in the first boat were not accounted for. However, a Standard Oil of California tanker, W. S. Miller, happened to find them, and landed them at Los Angeles. Cuba's passengers, crew and cargo were all successfully rescued.

The remainder of Reno's squadron continued with the speed trial. It led to the Honda Point disaster later that day, in which seven of the destroyers were wrecked and 23 sailors died.

Cuba's wreck forms an artificial reef, and supports marine life including the California sheephead. As such, it is now a wreck diving site.

== Bibliography ==
- Drechsel, Edwin (1994). Norddeutscher Lloyd, Bremen, 1857–1970: History, Fleet, Ship Mails. Vol. I. Vancouver: Cordillera Publishing. ISBN 978-1-895590-14-2. OCLC 30357825.
- Lloyd's Register of British and Foreign Shipping. Vol. I.–Steamers. London: Lloyd's Register of Shipping. 1898 – via Internet Archive.
- Lloyd's Register of Shipping. Vol. I.–Steamers. London: Lloyd's Register of Shipping. 1919 – via Internet Archive.
- Lloyd's Register of Shipping. Vol. I.–Steamers. London: Lloyd's Register of Shipping. 1921 – via Internet Archive.
- Trudeau, Noah Andre (February 2010). "A Naval Tragedy's Chain of Errors". Naval History Magazine. 24 (1).
- United States Department of Commerce (1918). Fiftieth Annual List of Merchant Vessels of the United States. Washington, DC: Government Printing Office – via HathiTrust.
