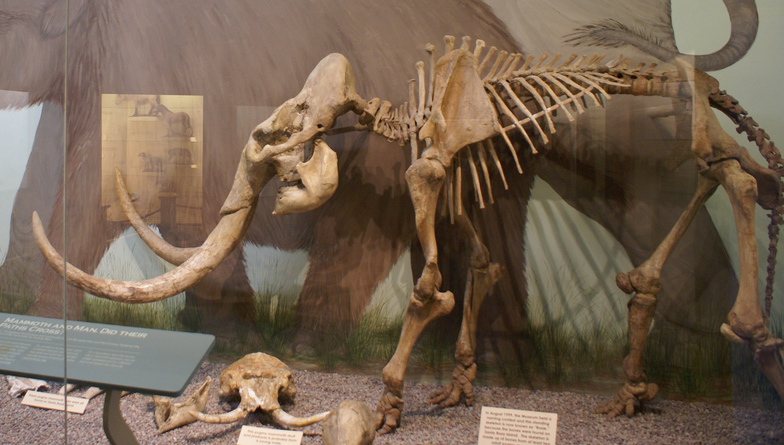
- Skeleton at the Santa Barbara Museum of Natural History

Scientific classification
- Kingdom: Animalia
- Phylum: Chordata
- Class: Mammalia
- Order: Proboscidea
- Family: Elephantidae
- Genus: †Mammuthus
- Species: †M. exilis

Binomial name
- †Mammuthus exilis (Stock & Furlong, 1928)

= Pygmy mammoth =

Pygmy mammoth Temporal range: Late Pleistocene 0.08–0.013 Ma

Species of mammoth

The pygmy mammoth or Channel Islands mammoth (Mammuthus exilis) is an extinct species of dwarf mammoth native to the northern Channel Islands off the coast of southern California during the Late Pleistocene. It was descended from the Columbian mammoth (M. columbi) of mainland North America, which are suggested to have colonised the islands around 250–150,000 years ago. At only 1.72–2.02 m (5.6–6.6 ft) tall at the shoulder, it was around 17% the size of its mainland ancestor. The species became extinct around 13,000 years ago, coinciding with major environmental change and the arrival of humans in the Channel Islands.

== Discovery ==
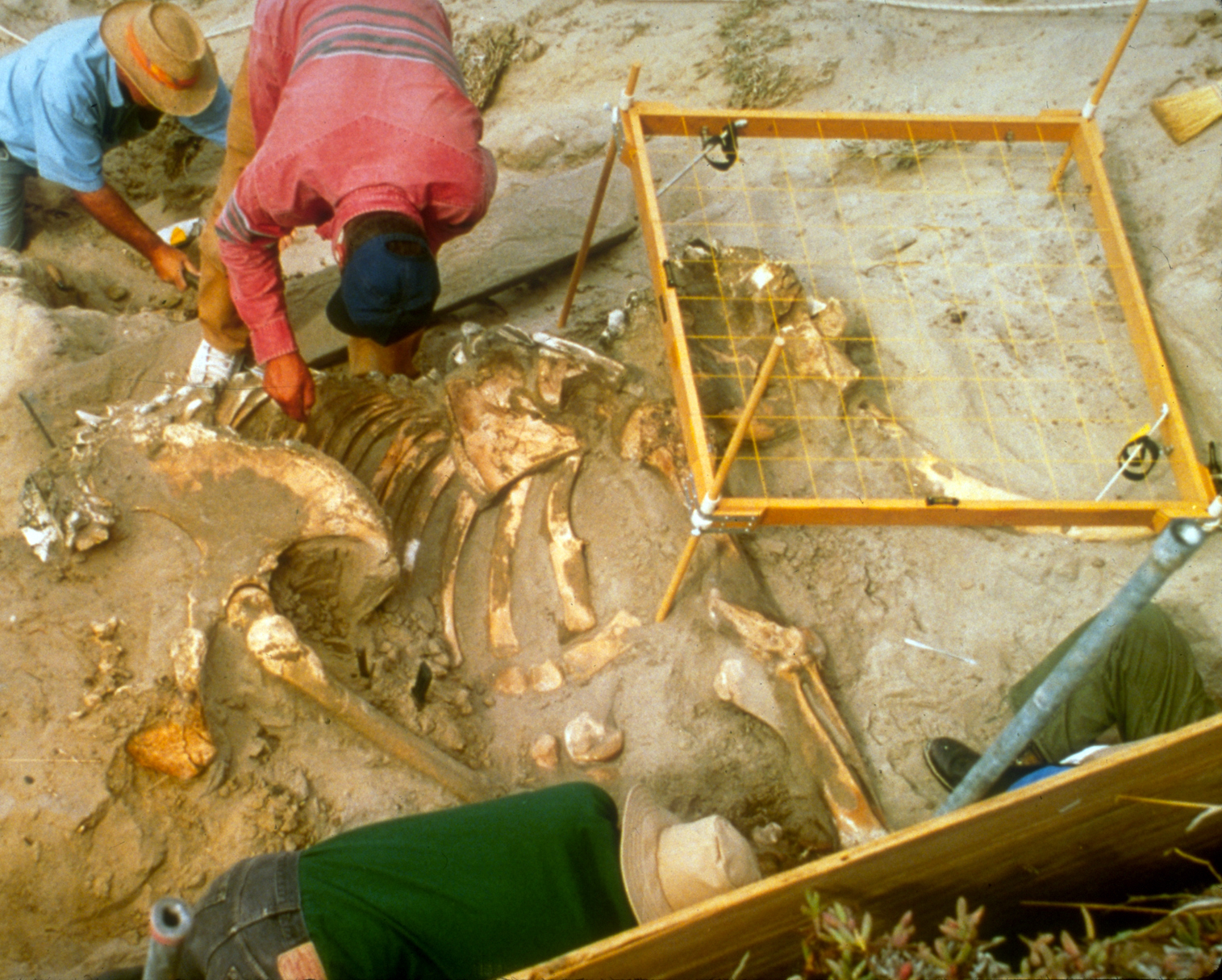
Excavation in 1994, Santa Rosa

Mammoth remains have been known on the northern Channel Islands of California since 1856. They were first reported in scientific literature in 1873.

In 1994 the National Park Service called in scientists to inspect an uncovered, unidentified skeleton found on the northeast coast of Santa Rosa Island. They found bones of the axial skeleton of a large land vertebrate and decided to excavate and dig up the skeleton. They recovered 90% of a mature male pygmy mammoth's skeleton. The mammoth was about 50 years old when it died. The small bones were preserved in life position, which represented that it had died where it was found rather than being scattered around the island. The bones were returned to the Santa Barbara Museum of Natural History. After the discovery of the skeleton, a pedestrian survey of the island began. This resulted in the discovery of 160 new locations of mammoth remains, the vast majority being found on Santa Rosa Island. This was the first discovery of a nearly complete specimen of the pygmy mammoth. The skeleton was only missing a foot, a tusk, and a couple of vertebrae. The remains were covered by a sand dune, which prevented the bones from scattering and kept them intact.

== Distribution ==
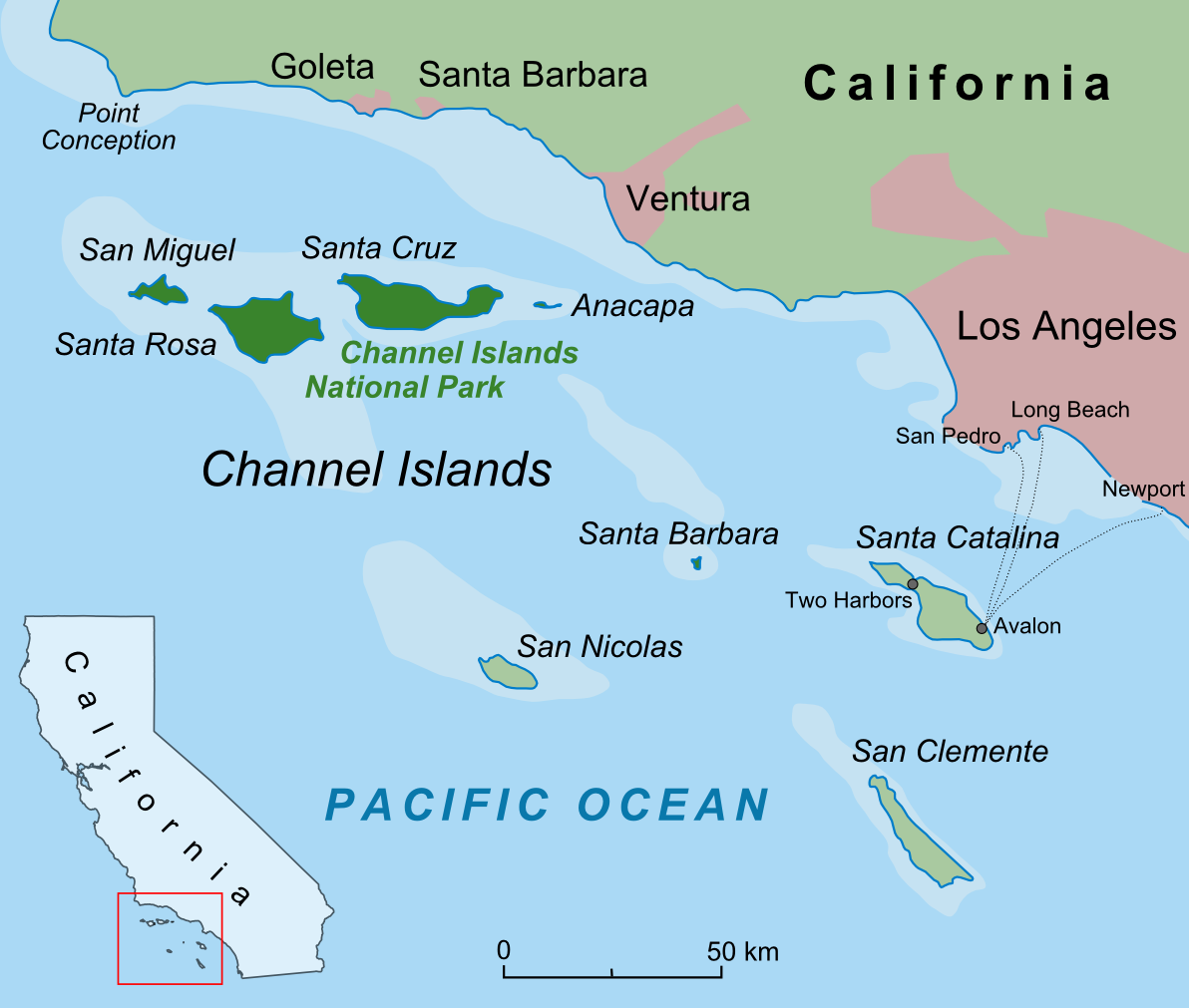
Northern Channel Islands which M. exilis inhabited shown in dark green, with maximum extent of Santa Rosae shown in light blue surrounding the islands

Remains of M. exilis have been discovered on three of the northern Channel Islands of California: Santa Cruz, Santa Rosa, and San Miguel, which together with Anacapa were the highest portions of the now mostly submerged superisland of Santa Rosae which existed during times of lowered sea level. The area of the combined island has been estimated at 2,200 square kilometres (850 sq mi), though the area of the island fluctuated as a result of glacial cycles.

== Evolution ==
The oldest fossil of mammoths on the Channel Islands is a tusk found on a marine terrace on Santa Rosa Island, which has been dated based on surrounding corals as 83,800 ± 600 – 78,600 ± 500 years old. It is suggested that their Columbian mammoth ancestors colonised the islands either around 250,000 or 150,000 years ago, when sea levels were considerably lower than they are today. During these times, the distance to the mainland was reduced to a minimum of 7 kilometres (4.3 mi), though there was never a land bridge as has often historically been suggested. Mammoths, like living elephants, were probably good swimmers and able to swim this distance. The reduction in body size was the result of insular dwarfism as a result of the smaller land area of the Channel Islands relative to the mainland, which is observed in other island animal species, such as dwarf elephants known from islands in the Mediterranean.

== Description ==
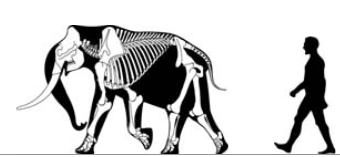
Size of the mostly complete Santa Rosa specimen discovered in 1994 compared to a human

M. exilis was, on average, 1.72–2.02 m (5.6–6.6 ft) tall at the shoulders and 760–1,350 kg (1,680–2,980 lb) in weight, making it around 17% of the body size of its 3.72–4.2 m (12.2–13.8 ft) tall, 9.2–12.5 t (9.1–12.3 long tons; 10.1–13.8 short tons) ancestor. Like other mammoths, the species exhibited sexual dimorphism, with males being larger than females. The limb bones of the species show isometric growth (preserving length-width ratio) from juveniles to adults, similar to those of living African elephants. In comparison to Columbian mammoths, the femur has a rounded rather than elliptical cross-section, and lacks a lateral tuberosity. The tusks are relatively straight and are around 50% the length and diameter of those of Columbian mammoths.

== Habitat and ecology ==
During the Last Glacial Period, the mega-island of Santa Rosae is thought to have been forested with coniferous trees of cypress, douglas fir and pine. Dental microwear analysis suggests that species had a primarily browsing based diet on leaves and twigs, as opposed to the more grazing focused diet of its Columbian mammoth ancestors. In comparison to its larger ancestor, it likely had the ability to ascend somewhat steeper slopes. The island exhibited a depauperate fauna that lacked large predators. The Channel Islands fox was not present on the islands during the time of the pygmy mammoth, having only arrived on the islands around 7,300 years ago.

== Extinction ==
The youngest records of the species date to around 13,000 years ago. This time coincides with the reduction of the area of Santa Rosae as a result of rising sea level, the arrival of humans in the Channel Islands (as evidenced by Arlington Springs Man) and climatic change resulting in the decline of the previously dominant conifer forest ecosystems and expansion of scrub and grassland, possibly induced by wildfires. It is therefore difficult to disentangle the precise causes of its extinction, though the pygmy mammoths had likely survived a greater reduction in island area during the preceding Last Interglacial/Sangamonian.

== See also ==
- Mammuthus lamarmorai, a dwarf mammoth species known from the Middle-Late Pleistocene of Sardinia
- Mammuthus creticus, a dwarf mammoth species known from the Early Pleistocene of Crete.
