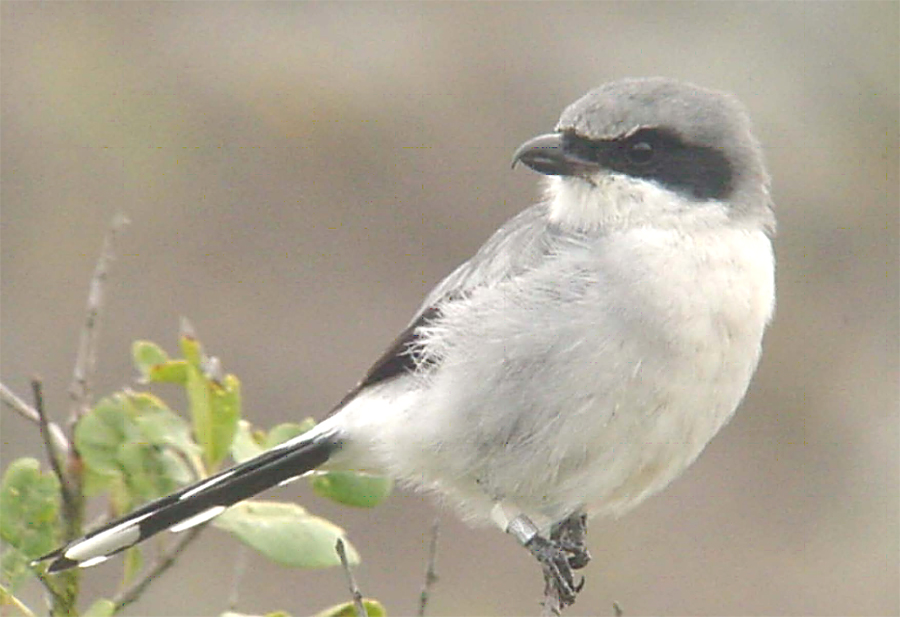

Conservation status
- Critically Imperiled (NatureServe)

- Endangered (ESA)

Scientific classification
- Kingdom: Animalia
- Phylum: Chordata
- Class: Aves
- Order: Passeriformes
- Family: Laniidae
- Genus: Lanius
- Species: L. ludovicianus
- Subspecies: L. l. mearnsi

Trinomial name
- Lanius ludovicianus mearnsi Ridgway, 1903

= San Clemente loggerhead shrike =

Subspecies of bird

The San Clemente loggerhead shrike (Lanius ludovicianus mearnsi) or San Clemente Island loggerhead shrike is a subspecies of the loggerhead shrike that is endemic to San Clemente Island, California, United States.

== Description ==
The San Clemente loggerhead shrike is a passerine bird of medium size. Around its eyes, it has black feathers, a color which is also found in the tail and on the wings. On its back, it has gray feathers. The underside of the bird is white. It also has patches of white on its wings and tail. The San Clemente loggerhead shrike has the darkest gray feathers compared to its other loggerhead shrike counterparts.

== Genetics/Phylogeny ==
It has been known that the Santa Catalina loggerhead shrike population had clustered closely with the San Clemente loggerhead shrikes, so there has been historic gene flow between the two. Still, the San Clemente loggerhead shrike is now its own subspecies.

A study found that there was very little genetic variation within the San Clemente loggerhead shrike population, implying that their independent population formed recently compared to other loggerhead shrike populations.

== Behaviour ==
The San Clemente loggerhead shrike is also called a "butcher bird" since preys on animals similar to its own size such as mammals and reptiles. Shrikes often impale their prey on something sharp after they finish hunting. They rely on elevated perches to spot their prey when hunting. If their habitat lacks enough elevated perch spots, they will expand their territory. Loggerhead shrikes have "tomial teeth". These projections in their mandible jab at the spinal cord of their prey to paralyze them. They also use the white patches on their wings to stun or spook their prey while hunting. Lizards are the most common prey to illicit the wing-flashing behavior.

Breeding begins around January and lasts until mid-August. Similar to other loggerhead shrikes, San Clemente loggerhead shrikes reach maturity after a year and live in monogamous pairs. The pair both care for the eggs and young. The clutch size is usually around five eggs. A female may kill a male if paired incorrectly by biologists in captive breeding programs.

San Clemente loggerhead shrikes have been observed to attack Northern Mockingbirds. They also compete with American Kestrels on their hunting grounds due to the lack of underbrush from the goats and other grazers.

== Distribution and habitat ==
The San Clemente loggerhead shrike is native to San Clemente Island, a small island off the coast of California, United States. The island is owned by the United States Navy and is used as an active training site, often for training with explosives. The San Clemente loggerhead shrike typically inhabits woody, shrubby canyons of the island, also described as a xeric landscape.

== Conservation ==
Since the 1880s, the San Clemente loggerhead shrike's habitat has been threatened by domestic animals, primarily goats, imported to San Clemente Island. The predation of the shrikes by cats and rats also played a role. By the early 1900s, the bird's population had declined to about 20, but stabilized. The Navy began removing introduced species in 1973. In 1977, the San Clemente loggerhead shrike was listed as endangered by the United States government, with an estimated population of 50. Between 1982 and 1999, the bird's population was measured between 14 and 33 birds, bottoming out in January 1998. The removal of feral goats and sheep was completed in 1993.

The U.S. Endangered Species Act listed the San Clemente Island fox as endangered. These foxes prey on the San Clemente loggerhead shrike, so the U.S. Fish and Wildlife Service requested the foxes to be excluded from the list due to ongoing recovery programs that had been euthanizing the San Clemente Island fox.

The San Diego Zoo and Wild Animal Park began a captive breeding program in an attempt to recover the species after the San Clemente loggerhead shrike was listed as endangered.

In 1996, the Institute for Wildlife Studies conducted video research on the shrike for the Navy. In 1997, they were asked to come up with a strategy to raise the bird's numbers. A captive breeding program was launched in 1992 at a cost of $3 million per year, and new policies were instituted to help the shrike. For example, the Navy limited their practice bombings and became more proactive about fire control started from the bombings. Thanks to the program, the bird's population reached 135 (captive and wild) specimens by 2004. In 2009, an estimated 82 pairs were alive; this number decreased to 41 until 2017 due to drought in Southern California.
