= San Miguel Island =

Island of the Channel Islands in California, United States

Coordinates: 34°2′23″N 120°22′32″W

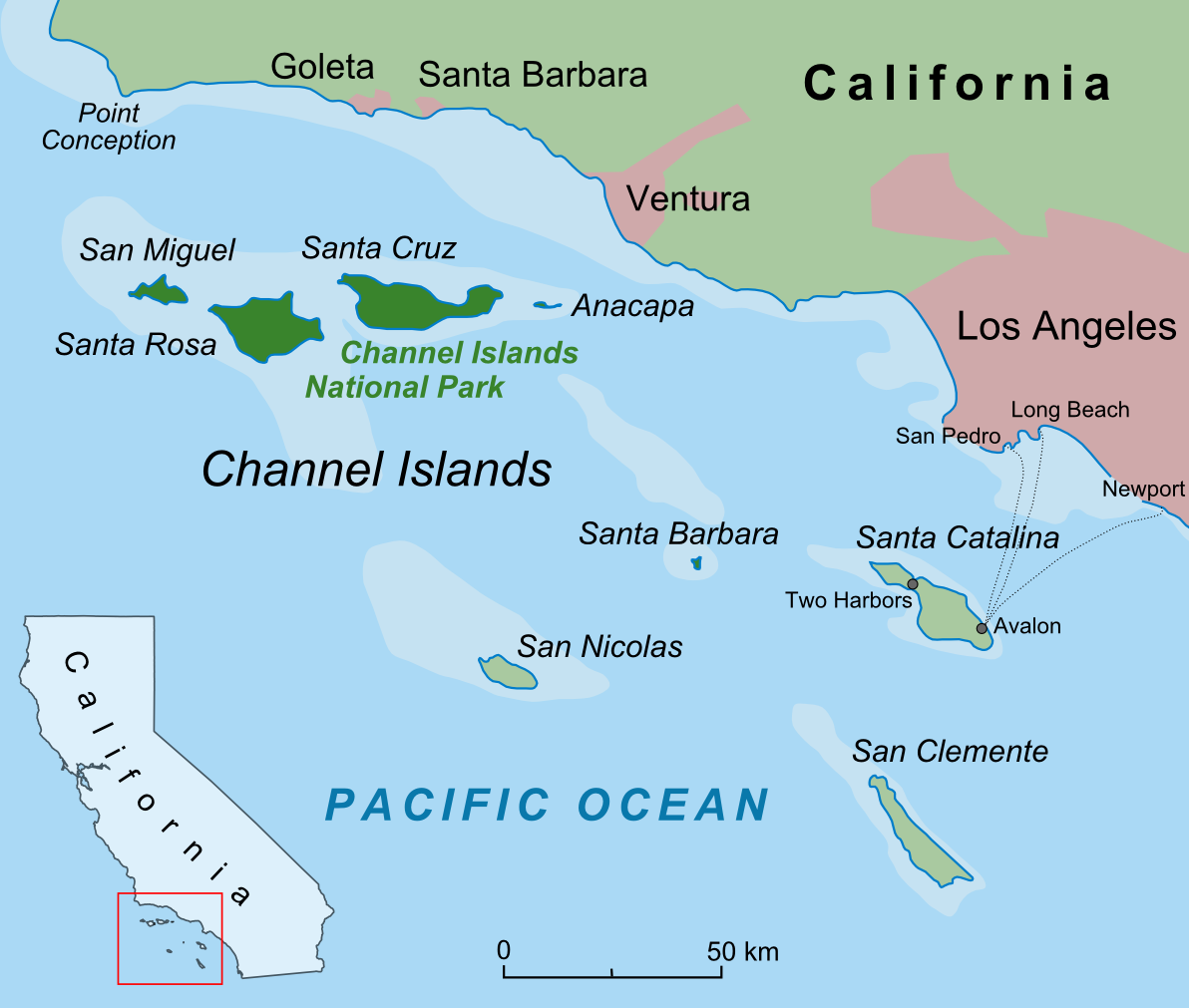
Map of Channel Islands

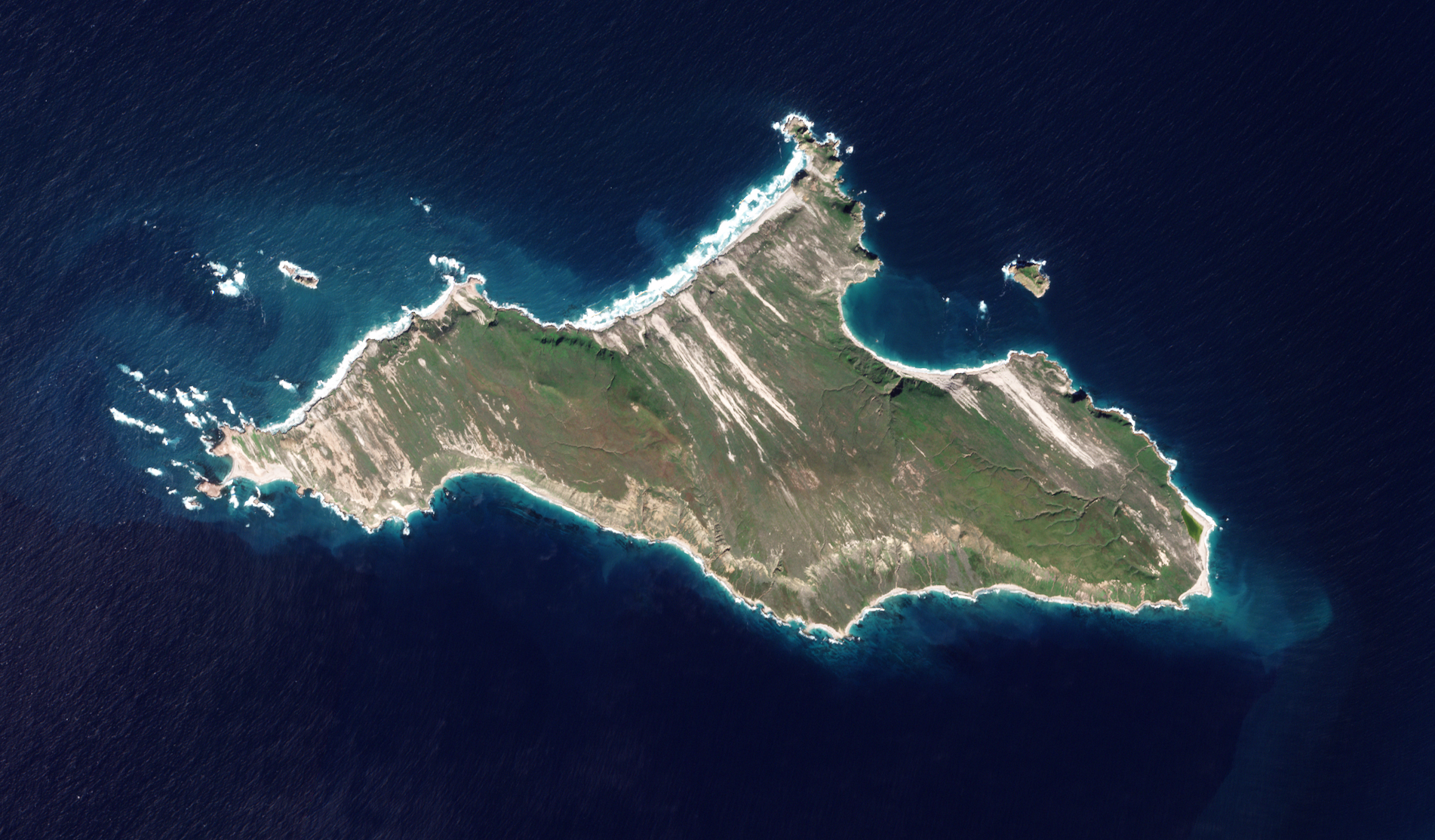
Satellite picture

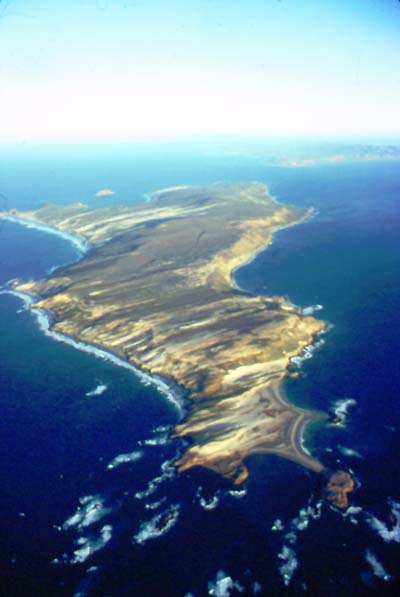
Aerial view of San Miguel

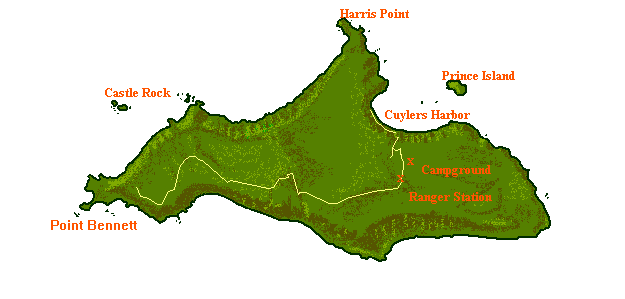
NPS Map: San Miguel Island

San Miguel Island (Chumash: Tuqan) is the westernmost of California's Channel Islands, located across the Santa Barbara Channel in the Pacific Ocean, within Santa Barbara County, California. San Miguel is the sixth-largest of the eight Channel Islands at 9,325 acres (3,774 ha), including offshore islands and rocks. Prince Island, 700 m (2,300 ft) off the northeastern coast, measures 35 acres (14 ha) in area. The island, at its farthest extent, is 8 miles (13 km) long and 3.7 miles (6.0 km) wide.

San Miguel Island is owned by the United States Department of the Navy and is part of Channel Islands National Park. Almost all of the island (8,960 acres (36.3 km^{2})) has also been designated as an archaeological district on the National Register of Historic Places. This westernmost Channel Island receives northwesterly winds and severe weather from the open ocean. The cold and nutrient-rich water surrounding the island is home to a diverse array of sea life that is not found on the southern islands.

San Miguel Island, together with numerous small islets around it, is defined by the United States Census Bureau as Block 3010, Block Group 3, Census Tract 29.10 of Santa Barbara County, California. The island is uninhabited. The highest peak is San Miguel Hill, at 831 feet (253 m).

Public passenger access to San Miguel Island is provided by the Island Packers ferry service out of the Ventura Harbor.

== History ==
Colonies of ancient puffins lived on the island in the Late Pleistocene. There is also fossil evidence for a giant mouse and dwarf mammoth during the same time period.

Archaeological research has shown that San Miguel Island was first settled by humans about 13,000 years ago, when San Miguel was still part of the larger Santarosae Island that was closer to the coast and connected the northern Channel Islands when sea levels were lower near the end of the Last Glacial. Because the northern Channel Islands have not been connected to the adjacent mainland in recent geological history, the Paleo-Indians who first settled the island clearly had boats and other maritime technologies. San Miguel was occupied by the ancestors of the Chumash people for many millennia, who developed a complex and rich maritime culture based on marine fishing, hunting, and gathering. Rough seas and risky landings did not daunt the Chumash people. They called the island Tuqan in the Chumash language, and for many centuries, they built and used sophisticated canoes, called tomols, made from sewn planks caulked with asphaltum (bitumen). In tomols, they fished and hunted in island waters and participated in active trade with their neighbors on the other islands and mainland.

=== Tuqan Man ===
The skull and bones of a man buried between 9,800 and 10,200 years ago, as indicated by radiocarbon dating and evaluation of artifacts buried with him, were exposed by beach erosion and discovered in 2005 by University of Oregon archaeologists. They were analyzed, but it was not possible to extract the Tuqan Man's DNA, though increasingly better testing and methods became available and were utilized. The remains were studied before their return to the island, which was delayed by resolution of tribal identification and ownership issues contingent on the precedent setting Kennewick Man case in Washington State. Under the Native American Graves Protection and Repatriation Act (NAGPRA), they were restored to the claiming Chumash tribe in May, 2018, for reburial on the island.

A remaining population of a dwarf species descended from Columbian mammoths, existed on Santarosae Island when it was first visited by Paleoindians, but were extinct for perhaps three millennia prior to the death of Tuqan Man.

The midden at Daisy Cave is the oldest coastal shell midden in North America. It had an early human occupation approximately 11,500 years ago. * A metacarpal bone of a short-faced bear was found in the cave. It may have been carried from the mainland by a bird as other evidence of the bear living on the islands has not been found.

=== Chumash villages ===
There is evidence of the fishing prowess of inhabitants using their tomols, and which included nets, spears, rods, lines, and hooks. Two Chumash villages were active with about 100 inhabitants at the time of Cabrillo's visit in 1542 aboard the San Miguel. San Miguel is the name George Vancouver gave the island on his 1793 chart. Vancouver adopted the name from a Spanish chart that had come into his possession.

The first European explorer to land was the explorer Juan Rodríguez Cabrillo in 1542, who commanded three Spanish ships that spent several weeks on the island while exploring the Santa Barbara Channel and California Coast. Cabrillo died on the island and is thought by many to have been buried there. The last of the island Chumash were removed to mainland missions and towns in the 1820s, leaving San Miguel largely uninhabited until ranchers raised sheep there from 1850 to 1948. One of the ranch families that homesteaded the longest was the Lesters, a family of four that left the island at the time of Pearl Harbor due to the dangers posed by the war.

=== Ranching and government ownership ===
George Nidever was the highest bidder for Samuel C. Bruce's property on the island in an auction held by the Santa Barbara County sheriff's office in June 1863. Bruce was one of the island's squatters. Nidever set up a sheep operation, but sold out to Hiram and Warren Mills in 1869. The Mills brothers eventually sold out to the Pacific Wool Growing Company. They sold their interest to David Fitzgibbon in 1887, who sold it back to Warren Mills, in partnership with William Waters. Warren Mills sold his interest to Elias Beckman in 1892. In 1897, Waters formed the San Miguel Island Company with Jeremiah Conroy, consisting of 3000 sheep and other livestock. However, the United States General Land Office ruled that no one had ever made claim to the island and that it remained in federal ownership. In 1911, the federal government assigned ownership of the island to United States Department of Commerce. Waters signed a 5-year lease with the federal government in 1911, which was renewed in 1916. Waters died in 1920, and the lease was renewed by his partners Robert Brooks and J. R. Moore. Brooks renewed the lease again in 1925. The United States Department of the Navy took ownership of the island from the Department of Commerce and Moore renewed his lease with the Navy in 1935. Brooks hired Herbert Lester to tenant manage the ranch in 1929, who did so with his family until his death in 1942. He is buried above Harris Point.

Despite a lighthouse on Richardson's Rock and a bell buoy, numerous ships continued to be wrecked on the island. Of note was the SS Cuba in 1923, though passengers and gold were saved.

Ralph Hoffmann died while on an expedition to the island in 1932.

During World War II, the United States Navy stationed three sailor lookouts on the island. On July 5, 1943, a B-24 crashed into Green Mountain, killing all 12 aboard. In 1948, the navy reclaimed the island as a target in its Pacific Missile Range for guided missiles and bombing. The National Park Service initiated a visitor program run by a resident ranger in 1978, but the navy retained ownership.

Urchin diver James Robinson is believed to have been killed by a shark off Harris Point in the area known as Shark Park in 1994.

== Park Service operations ==
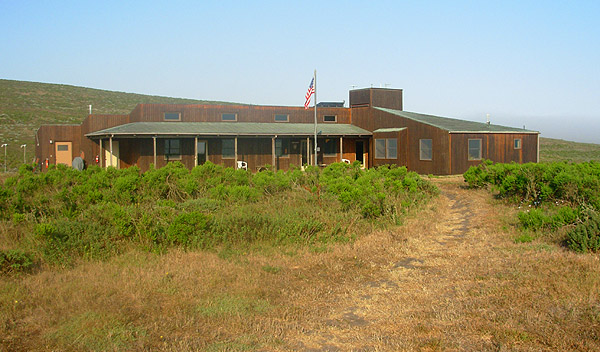
San Miguel Island Ranger Station

The National Park Service (NPS) maintains two airstrips, a ranger station and a research station on San Miguel Island. The Island is normally staffed by a ranger who enforces park laws, while also providing interpretive services for public visitors. The island also hosts scientists who study pinnipeds and manage the island fox captive breeding program that is conducted on the island. Volunteer interpretive rangers often fill in for regularly paid rangers due to budget deficits within the park.

== Fauna ==
In July 2011, researchers discovered that a "loomerie" (breeding colony) of the California common murre (Uria aalge californica) had returned to Prince Island, an islet off San Miguel Island, for the first time since 1912. Like penguins, the football-size black-and-white seabirds use their wings to "fly" deep underwater, but unlike penguins, they also fly in the air. This colony disappeared nearly a century ago, likely because of egg harvesting, but now their southern range is re-established.

In the 1960s, northern fur seals (Callorhinus ursinus) successfully recolonized San Miguel Island, making the island the 3rd American (and southernmost) breeding colony. The first seals had flipper tags identifying them as being from the Pribilof or Commander Islands in the Bering Sea. By 2006, nearly 100 pups were born. Today the San Miguel colony numbers around 10,000 animals, with the pup count alone reaching 1,709 individuals by 2016, reflecting a 45% average (but highly variable) annual increase in new pups over the past 21 years. Great white sharks, which prey on the seals and sea lions, are fairly common in the waters around the island, hunted by orcas.

== Climate ==
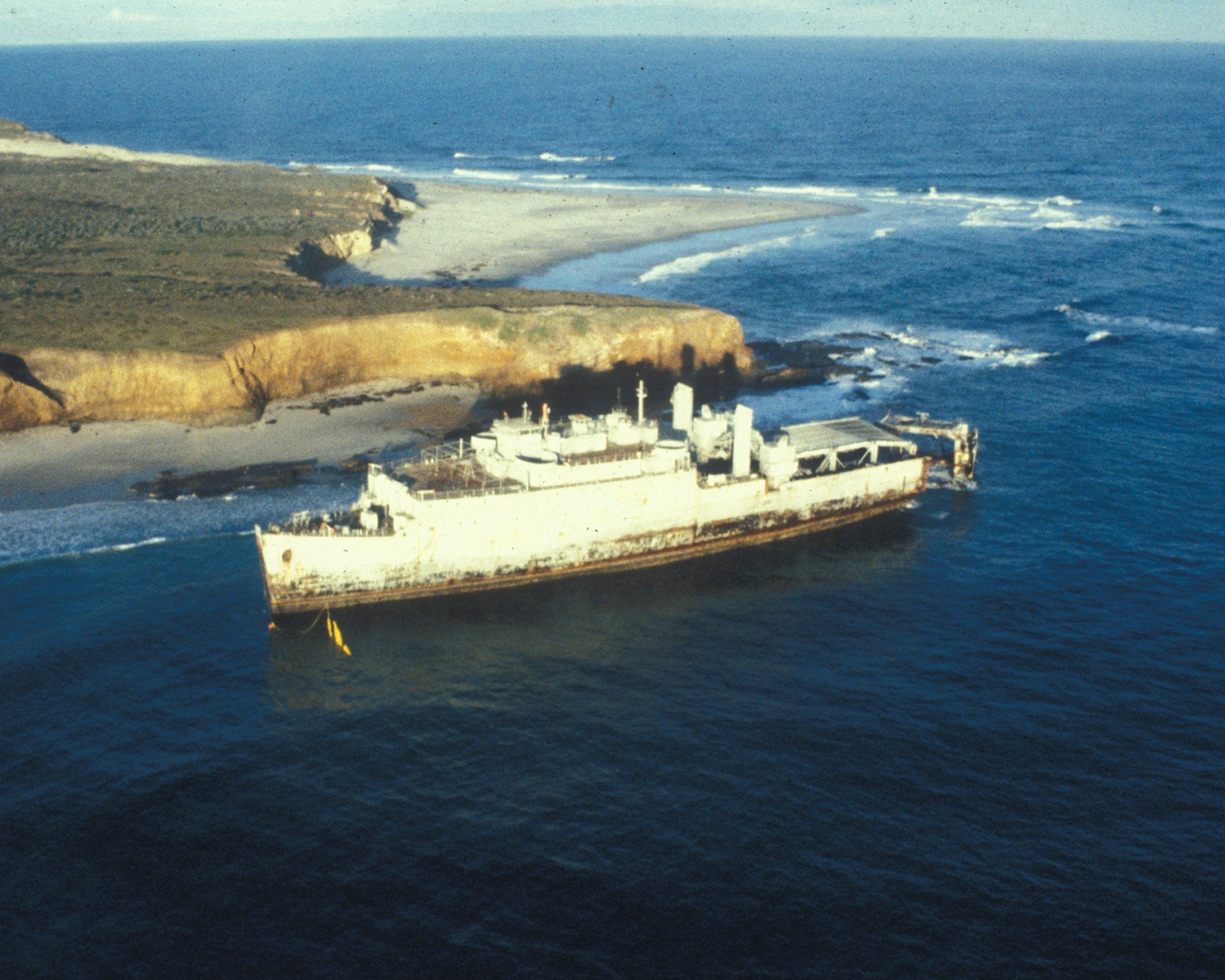
USS Tortuga (LSD-26) in 1987 near Cardwell Point. Foul weather and submerged rock and shoals has caused shipwrecks around San Miguel Island. The ship was towed out to sea and sunk.

San Miguel Island does not receive protection from the open ocean as do the other Channel Islands. Most of the time a strong northwest wind blows across the island. These winds typically exceed 25 mph (40 km/h) and can surpass 50 mph (80 km/h). When strong high pressure is over the mainland, the winds often cease.

Heavy fog is common on the island, especially during May and June. On warmer days the fog will burn off only to have the strong northwest wind blow in additional fog from the open ocean. On foggy days the temperature will rarely exceed 55 °F (13 °C). The cold and windy summer climate is much more similar to coastal locations much farther north, along the coast of Northern California than it is to Southern California. Annual rainfall is about 17 inches, mostly falling between November and March.

Climate data for San Miguel Island (1981–2010)
Month	Jan	Feb	Mar	Apr	May	Jun	Jul	Aug	Sep	Oct	Nov	Dec	Year
Mean daily maximum °F (°C)	58.8 (14.9)	58.8 (14.9)	60.2 (15.7)	63.9 (17.7)	63.9 (17.7)	66.7 (19.3)	70.6 (21.4)	70.1 (21.2)	68.0 (20.0)	68.0 (20.0)	62.8 (17.1)	62.6 (17.0)	64.5 (18.1)
Daily mean °F (°C)	54.5 (12.5)	54.4 (12.4)	54.1 (12.3)	56.3 (13.5)	56.9 (13.8)	59.7 (15.4)	62.7 (17.1)	62.6 (17.0)	61.5 (16.4)	61.0 (16.1)	56.7 (13.7)	56.7 (13.7)	58.1 (14.5)
Mean daily minimum °F (°C)	50.2 (10.1)	50.0 (10.0)	47.9 (8.8)	48.7 (9.3)	49.8 (9.9)	52.6 (11.4)	54.7 (12.6)	55.1 (12.8)	54.9 (12.7)	53.9 (12.2)	50.5 (10.3)	50.7 (10.4)	51.6 (10.9)
Average rainfall inches (mm)	2.33 (59)	6.63 (168)	2.03 (52)	2.20 (56)	0.19 (4.8)	0.06 (1.5)	0.11 (2.8)	0.08 (2.0)	0.09 (2.3)	0.41 (10)	0.24 (6.1)	1.69 (43)	16.06 (407.5)

== Tourism ==
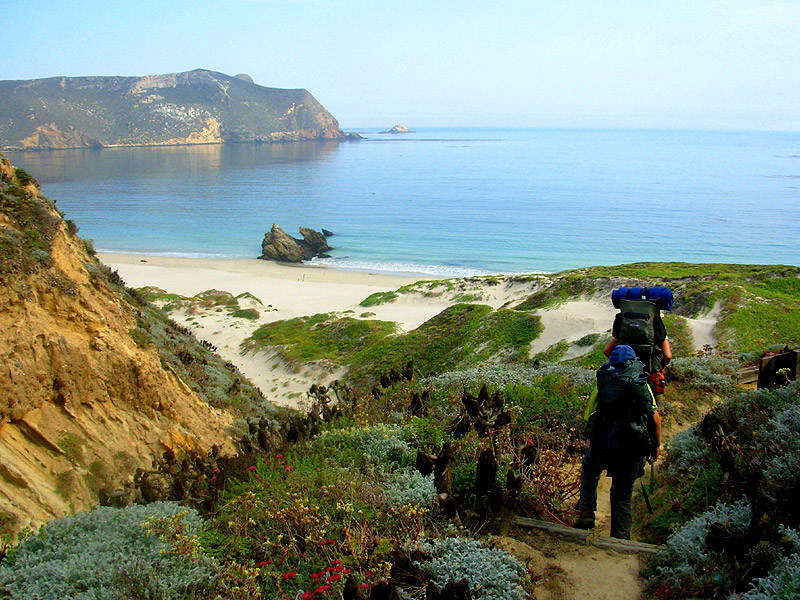
Hiking down to Cuyler Harbor from the campground

In May 2016, the island was reopened to tourism, following a two-year U.S. Navy survey over 18 miles (29 km) of marked trails and high-use areas. The survey intended to remove any dangerous ordnance in those areas. The NPS escorts all visitors and limits visitors to the established trail system. Visitors must sign an access permit and liability waiver. Access permits are available at the boat and air concession offices and at a self-registration station at the Nidever Canyon trailhead on San Miguel Island.

Island Packers and Channel Islands Aviation have concession agreements to provide transportation to the Island. Channel Islands Aviation provides on-demand service. There is no transportation available on the island so access is by foot, private boat or kayak.

=== Landing ===
Eight-foot seas (2.4 m) are not uncommon in the Pacific between Santa Rosa Island and San Miguel Island. The Island has no pier so all public visitors arriving by sea arrive by skiff at Cuyler Harbor. Landing on the island can be challenging, as the surf can swamp the landing boat. During ideal weather, visitors are put ashore directly in front of the trail that leads into the interior of the island. When the swell is high, visitors might be placed on the beach to the east or west, depending upon conditions.

=== Camping facilities ===
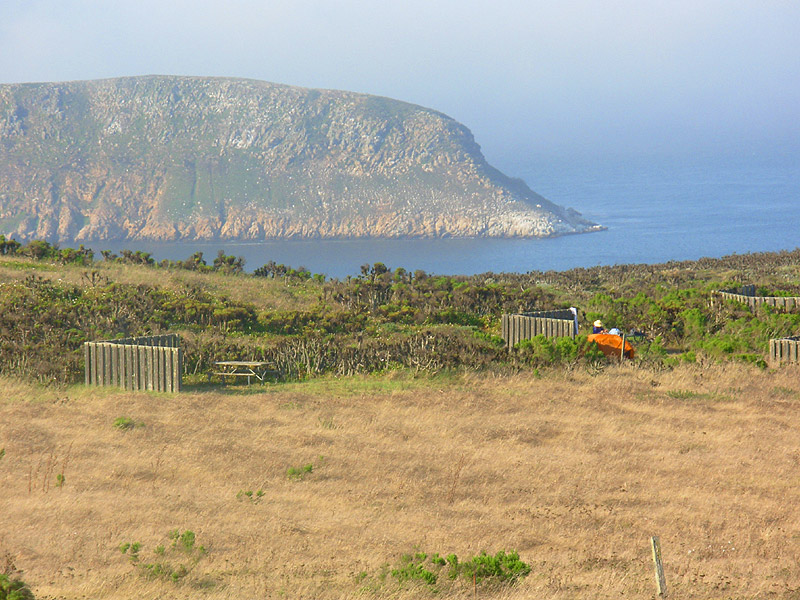
San Miguel Island Campground.

San Miguel Island includes a campground with nine sites. Each campsite includes a picnic table, wind break and an animal-proof box. The campground includes one pit toilet. Fires are prohibited due to the high winds and the inability to extinguish them. Sturdy tents are recommended as the wind can exceed 50 mph (80 km/h), even during the summer. It is recommended that campers tie their tents to the wind break to keep them from blowing away when not being occupied.

=== Hiking ===
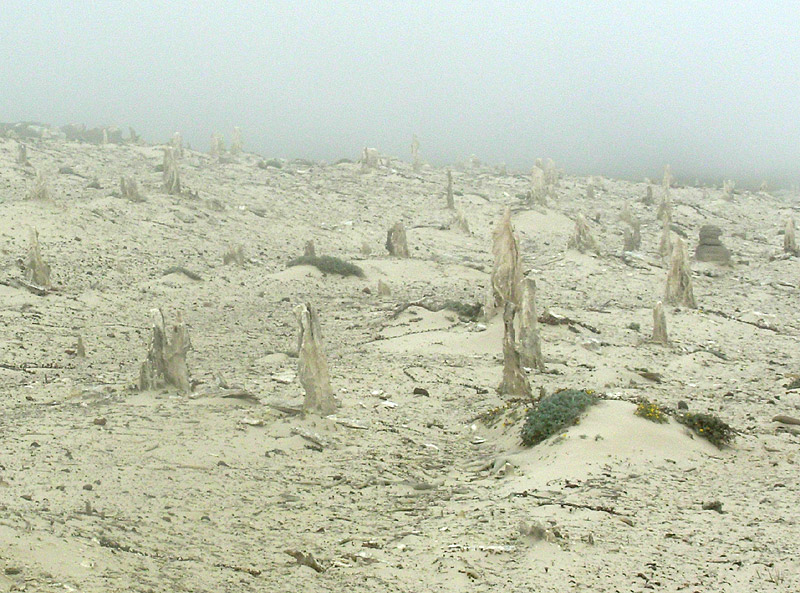
San Miguel's caliche forest near Cuyler's Harbor

With the exception of the trail leading from the beach in Cuyler Harbor to the campground and ranger station, hiking is restricted to ranger-led outings. Many visitors participate in the 14-mile (23 km) round trip hike to Point Bennett to view the thousands of elephant seals and sea lions that reside at the west end of the island during spring and summer. Another popular hike is to the island's caliche forest.

=== Water activities ===
Visitors to the island are restricted to ocean access at Cuyler Harbor. This landing is well protected from the strong ocean swell that is driven from the northwest. Cuyler has a sandy beach and visitors will often find themselves sharing the beach with elephant seals. The water is generally below 60 °F (16 °C), making it cold without a wetsuit. During low tides the harbor offers a tide pool area at the east end of the beach. Sea kayaking is not recommended for the novice as high winds can develop without notice. Bathers, divers and kayakers should be aware and alert to the occurrence of adult great white sharks in these waters, some up to 18 feet in length. It is unwise to enter the water in early morning or late afternoon to early evening hours when sharks are feeding close to shore.

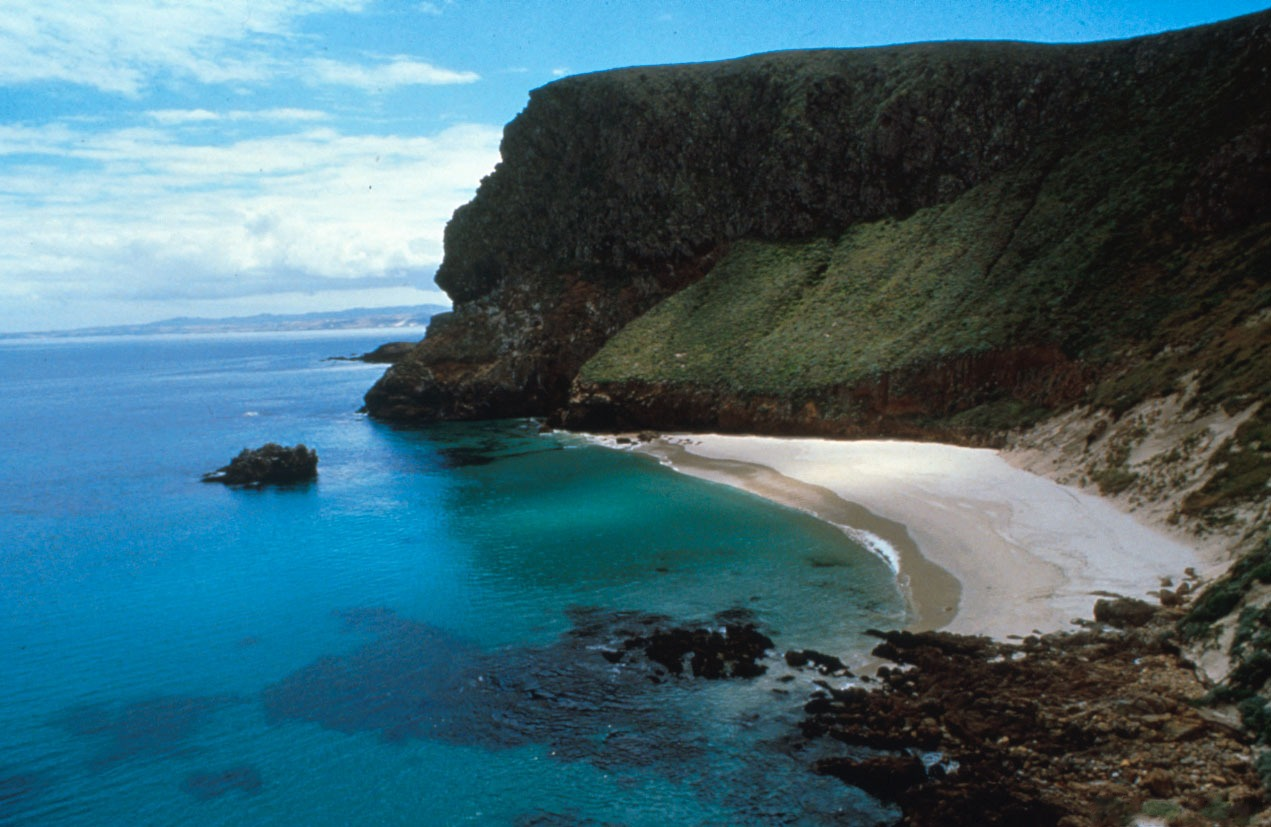
Cliffs, at San Miguel Island

== In popular culture ==
Portions of the 1935 film Mutiny on the Bounty were filmed on the island.

LIFE Magazine featured the Lester family's "reign" over the island in a 1930s photo feature. The 2012 T. C. Boyle novel San Miguel is a fictionalization of both the Waters' and Lesters' time on the island.

== See also ==
- Chumash people
- Santa Barbara Channel
- SS Cuba (1920)
