= Timofei Nikitich Tarakanov =

Russian explorer and fur trader (1774–after 1834)

Timofei Nikitich Tarakanov (c. 1774 – after 1834), also written Timofey Tarakanov, was born into serfdom near Kursk, Russia. His owner, Nikanor Ivanovich Pereverzev, sold him to the Russian-American Company (RAC) shortly after the company was created in 1799. He worked for the RAC in western North America and Hawaii from about 1800 to 1819. Tarakanov played an important role in the expansion of Russian operations south from Russian Alaska into Spanish California, usually as hunting party leader of indigenous sea otter hunters, mostly Aleut and Alutiiq people working for the RAC. This task often involved US maritime fur trade merchant ships transporting the hunting parties and their kayaks as far south as Baja California. Tarakanov played a key role in the founding of Fort Ross, California, and helped build and run Fort Elizabeth on Kauai in the Hawaiian Islands. He was granted manumission from serfdom and returned to his home near Kursk in 1819.

Very little is known about his early life. He was born into serfdom around 1774. Tarakanov probably became a serf-employee of the Russian-American Company (RAC) around 1800 or 1801. How he traveled from Kursk to Alaska is not known. He probably went to Kodiak on Kodiak Island, the capital of Russian America at the time. RAC records identify him as a promyshlennik, a term that came from the Siberian fur trade and which the RAC used for employees that were lower class Russians, sometimes Alaskan Creole people of mixed Russian and indigenous ancestry.

== 1803–1804 O'Cain voyage ==
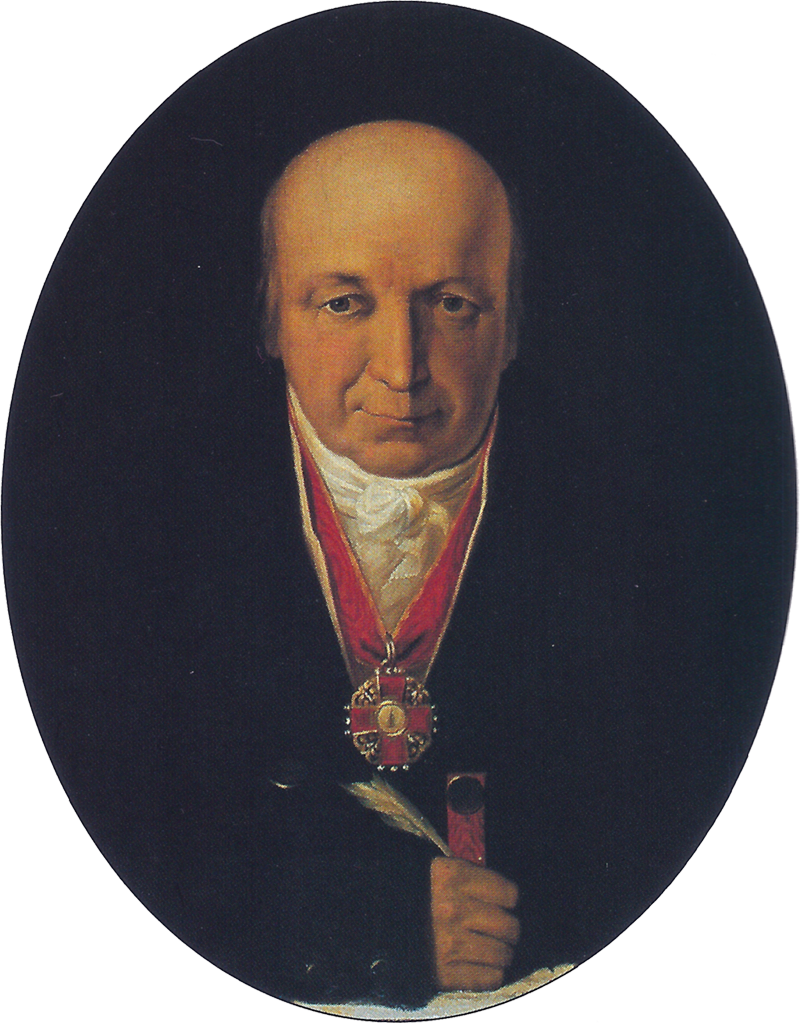
Alexandr Andreyevich Baranov, painting by Mikhail T. Tikhanov, 1818

In late 1803 the Boston-based maritime fur trading merchant ship O'Cain, under Joseph Burling O'Cain with supercargo Jonathan Winship, arrived at Kodiak on Kodiak Island, the capital of Russian America at the time. O'Cain met RAC Chief Manager Alexander Andreyevich Baranov and proposed a joint venture: The O'Cain would take RAC Aleut hunters and their kayaks and overseers to Spanish California to hunt sea otters. Baranov agreed. This was the first of many such joint ventures involving US ships taking RAC hunters and overseers to hunt California sea otters.

Baranov supplied O'Cain with twenty baidarkas (Aleutian kayaks) and about forty indigenous sea otter hunters, plus two overseers to manage the hunters and hunting. Afanasii Shvetsov was the senior Russian overseer and Timofei Tarakanov was assigned as the junior overseer. O'Cain sailed from Alaska direct to San Diego. Then he continued south to San Quintín Bay, about 200 mi (320 km) south of San Diego, on the west coast of Baja California—today the site of San Quintín, Baja California. O'Cain stayed in San Quintín Bay for over three months while Tarakanov and Shvetsov led indigenous sea otter hunting parties all along the coast between Mission Rosario and Misión Santo Domingo de la Frontera.

At the end of the hunt, O'Cain sailed for Alaska with 1,110 sea otter furs, plus 700 more acquired by illegal trade with Spanish officials and missionaries. O'Cain, Tarakanov, Shvetsov, and the hunting parties arrived back at Kodiak in June 1804.

== Rezanov and Juno ==
In 1805 Nikolai Rezanov and other high status aristocrats and naval officers arrived in Sitka, Alaska, which had just been recaptured from the Tlingit and would soon become the capital of Russian America. Sitka, a name derived from the Tlingit Sheetʼká, was known as Novo-Arkhangelsk by Russians and Americans at this time. Various American maritime fur traders also arrived in Sitka in 1805, including John DeWolf who sold his ship Juno to Rezanov and the RAC. The large number of visitors in Sitka worsened a food crisis over the winter of 1805–06, causing scurvy and famine. To alleviate the immediate crisis, Rezanov took Juno to San Francisco to obtain provisions from Governor José Joaquín de Arrillaga. RAC documentation is unclear, but it is possible that Tarakanov was part of this expedition.

== 1807–1808 Peacock voyage ==
Rezanov returned to Sitka with Juno and supplies in May or June 1806. About the same time, the brig Peacock under Oliver Kimball arrived seeking a joint venture to hunt California sea otters. Baranov agreed and assigned Tarakanov to lead the hunting party. Kimball took Tarakanov and his hunters first to Trinidad Bay. In early 1807 he moved his base of operations south to Bodega Bay, about 50 miles north of San Francisco and part of the future site of the RAC's Ross Colony. From this base Tarakanov led many hunting expeditions all along California's northern coast, from about Cape Mendocino to the Farallon Islands.

Tarakanov's establishment of a hunting base of operations in Bodega Bay in the spring of 1807 involved negotiating with the local Coast Miwoks for permission. Tarakanov later described acquiring temporary rights to some of the land near Bodega Bay. Over the following few years Tarakanov and Ivan Aleksandrovich Kuskov, the first manager of Fort Ross, met with Coast Miwok and Kashaya Pomo leaders multiple times. They gave various gifts, including special medallions made specifically for the purpose. The RAC later wrote reports saying they had acquired land cessions through these meetings, but they almost certainly misrepresented how the indigenous people viewed the gifts, negotiations, and agreements. The RAC and Russia's preparation of documentation showing land rights north of San Francisco Bay was intended for use in potential diplomatic conflicts with Spain, but for various geopolitical reasons it never became consequential.

During this time in early 1807, Tarakanov led hunting parties into San Francisco Bay, working the northern shores and avoiding the Spanish Presidio of San Francisco near the Golden Gate strait. As the hunters left the bay the Spanish presidio commander, Luis Antonio Argüello, fired upon them, causing a minor panic and a hasty retreat.

In May 1807 Kimball left Bodega Bay, taking Tarakanov and his hunters to San Quintín Bay, Baja California. There he met with the ship O'Cain before returning to Sitka. Tarakanov's hunters had brought over 1,000 sea otter skins worth approximately $30,000 in Guangzhou (Canton), China. The Chinese did not allow the RAC to trade at Canton, but permitted Americans such as O'Cain and Kimball—another factor that benefitted both the RAC and American traders in these joint ventures.

Additionally, Tarakanov had gained valuable experience with sea otter hunting on the coast of California as well as with communicating and negotiating with the indigenous Miwok. Baranov, recognizing this, began giving Tarakanov increased responsibilities and leadership roles within his promyshlenniki social class.

== 1808–1810 shipwreck and enslavement ==
Kimball's Peacock with Tarakanov on board, arrived back at Sitka in August 1807. About the same time the smaller Sv. Nikolai ("Saint Nicholas") arrived. This vessel, sometimes called a brig and sometimes a schooner, had been built in Hawaii by New Englanders as a gift for the Native Hawaiian King Kamehameha I. Originally named Tamara, King Kamehameha eventually sold it to two Americans who took it to Baja California. There it was acquired by the RAC employee Pavl Slobodchikov, who renamed it Sv. Nikolai and sailed it to Sitka. Baranov had also purchased the British brig Myrtle and renamed it Kad'iak ("Kodiak").

Baranov, eager to expand the RAC's operations in California and hoping to establish permanent outposts, arranged for the Kad'iak and Sv. Nikolai to work together exploring the coast between the Strait of Juan de Fuca and San Francisco Bay, and reconnoitering for potential outpost locations. The Sv. Nikolai was put under the command of Navigator Nikolai Bulygin, with Timofei Tarakanov assigned as prikashchik, or supercargo, responsible for managing the hunters and any trade with indigenous peoples that may occur. Baranov ordered Bulygin and Tarakanov to make a detailed survey of the coast south of the Strait of Juan de Fuca to the mouth of the Columbia River. At Grays Harbor or the mouth of the Columbia they were to meet Kad'iak, commanded by Navigator Ivan Petrov with the overall leader of the expedition, Ivan Kuskov, on board. Then the two vessels would continue south to California and establish an outpost at Bodega Bay or some other suitable site.

Baranov's written orders and advice to Tarakanov show that he considered Tarakanov's knowledge of the geography and the indigenous peoples of the coast of Northern California vital to the success of the overall expedition. As a serf, this responsibility and trust given by Baranov and other RAC officers was an important step to Tarakanov eventually obtaining his freedom.

Despite Baranov's careful planning, the voyage of Sv. Nikolai was a catastrophe. In November 1808, just a few weeks after leaving Sitka, the Sv. Nikolai wrecked on the Olympic Peninsula at Rialto Beach near the mouth of the Quillayute River and today's community of La Push within the Quileute Indian Reservation of the Quileute people. The castaways had minimal supplies and faced what became an 18-month chaotic ordeal. After some violent conflicts with the local Quileute and Hoh people the survivors became split up and enslaved by the Quileute, Hoh, and Makah. During their time there, at least seven RAC workers, including captain Bulygin and his wife, died from injuries, illness, or other consequences of their misadventures. Tarakanov took over as leader of the main group of survivors who became slaves of the Makah.

Accounts of the ordeal, including reports by Tarakanov, portray the Makah as relatively fair and benevolent, despite the enslavement. The Makah leader known as "Yutramaki" promised to try to sell the captives to whatever ship might sail by Makah territory. Many of the survivors willingly chose enslavement by the Makah over any other option they had. Among the Makah, Tarakanov, despite being a slave, gained Makah respect and admiration, partially through making things such as a large kite, various metal tools made from iron nails, carved wooden dishes, a "war rattle", and a large fortified lodge with gunports.

Although ships often visited the Makah town of Neah Bay none did for many months. Finally, in May 1810, the Boston-based maritime fur trading ship Lydia (later sold to the RAC and renamed Il'mena), under Thomas Brown, stopped at Neah Bay and made arrangements to buy the RAC survivors. Brown had encountered and bought one RAC survivor who had been sold southward such that Brown found him near the mouth of the Columbia River. Brown took the survivors to Sitka, where Baranov paid him for his expenses in rescuing them.

The expedition's second vessel, Kad'iak, with Kushov, waited for Sv. Nikolai at Grays Harbor before eventually sailing to Trinidad Bay, California, then Bodega Bay. Kushov spent the winter at Bodega Bay, making repairs and waiting for Sv. Nikolai. Despite difficulties with deserters, Kushov's hunters worked the coast in various places, including San Francisco Bay. They had almost 2,000 sea otter skins, an impressive and valuable cargo, when they returned to Sitka in October 1809. This financial success, coupled with Kushov's reconnoitering and Tarakanov's earlier exploration of the Bodega Bay area, led to Baranov proposing to the RAC Main Office in St. Petersburg to seek imperial governmental permission to establish a post in California. Count Nikolay Rumyantsev spoke with Emperor Alexander I, who approved the plan in November 1809. This soon resulted in the establishment of Fort Ross and the surrounding Ross Colony in what's now Sonoma County.

== 1810–1811 hunting in San Francisco Bay ==
Not long after Tarakanov was rescued and returned to Sitka, Baranov sent him on another hunting expedition in California over the winter of 1810–1811. The US ship Isabella, under William Heath Davis Sr, the father of William Heath Davis, took a hunting party with 48 kayaks and Tarakanov as overseer, to the Bodega Bay area. Once Tarakanov had set up a base of operations just north of San Francisco Bay, Davis left for Hawaii. Soon another US ship, the Albatross under Nathan Winship, brought another hunting party with 60 kayaks. Then in March 1811 a third hunting party of 22 kayaks came from Bodega Bay where Ivan Kushov had arrived on board the Chirikov. These hunting parties worked together in San Francisco Bay, probably eliminating sea otters in the bay. Kushov returned to Sitka with over 1,200 skins. In September 1811 Davis returned with Isabella and took Tarakanov's hunters, along with those from the Albatross, back to Sitka with another large cargo of sea otter furs.

After the return of this hunting expedition Baranov launched a major effort to establish an RAC outpost on the coast just north of San Francisco Bay. Credit for founding Fort Ross is usually given to the relatively high status Russian Ivan Kushov, but the serf Timofei Tarakanov was a vital part of the effort. RAC records are not entirely clear, but it appears that Tarakanov was Kushov's principal deputy and in charge of managing the indigenous sea otter hunters as well as indigenous people living in the Fort Ross and Bodega Bay areas.

== Establishment of Fort Ross ==
Russian documentation on the founding of Fort Ross has either not survived very well or remains to be discovered. According to RAC writer, employee and future manager Kirill Khlebnikov, the Chirikov left Sitka to found Fort Ross in November 1811, although other sources say it was delayed until mid-March 1812. Tarakanov was either on board or soon arrived in California some other way. Kuskov investigated Bodega Bay and the Russian River valley, but found both wanting in defensive potential and lacking a good supply of timber for construction. Good timber was found along the coast a little north of the Russian River, so Fort Ross was founded there, on a defensible knoll near a stream and a small but serviceable cove for ships. To the Kashaya Pomo, the region in which Fort Ross was built was known as Metini. Over time a native village known as "Metini Village" grew just north of Fort Ross.

While Kuskov was looking for the ideal site for Fort Ross, Tarakanov again met with Coast Miwok and Kashaya Pomo indigenous leaders of the Bodega Bay and Fort Ross coast areas, giving lavish gifts. Some historians have described these transactions as a purchase of the land, but others as well as the Miwok and Kashaya peoples, describe it as a more complicated agreement of mutual friendship and cooperation. In 1818 Russia took steps to prepare diplomatic arguments to use with Spain, claiming that indigenous land rights were acquired. But most historians doubt the veracity of the events described in these diplomatic documents.

== 1814–1815: Fort Ross and the Channel Islands ==
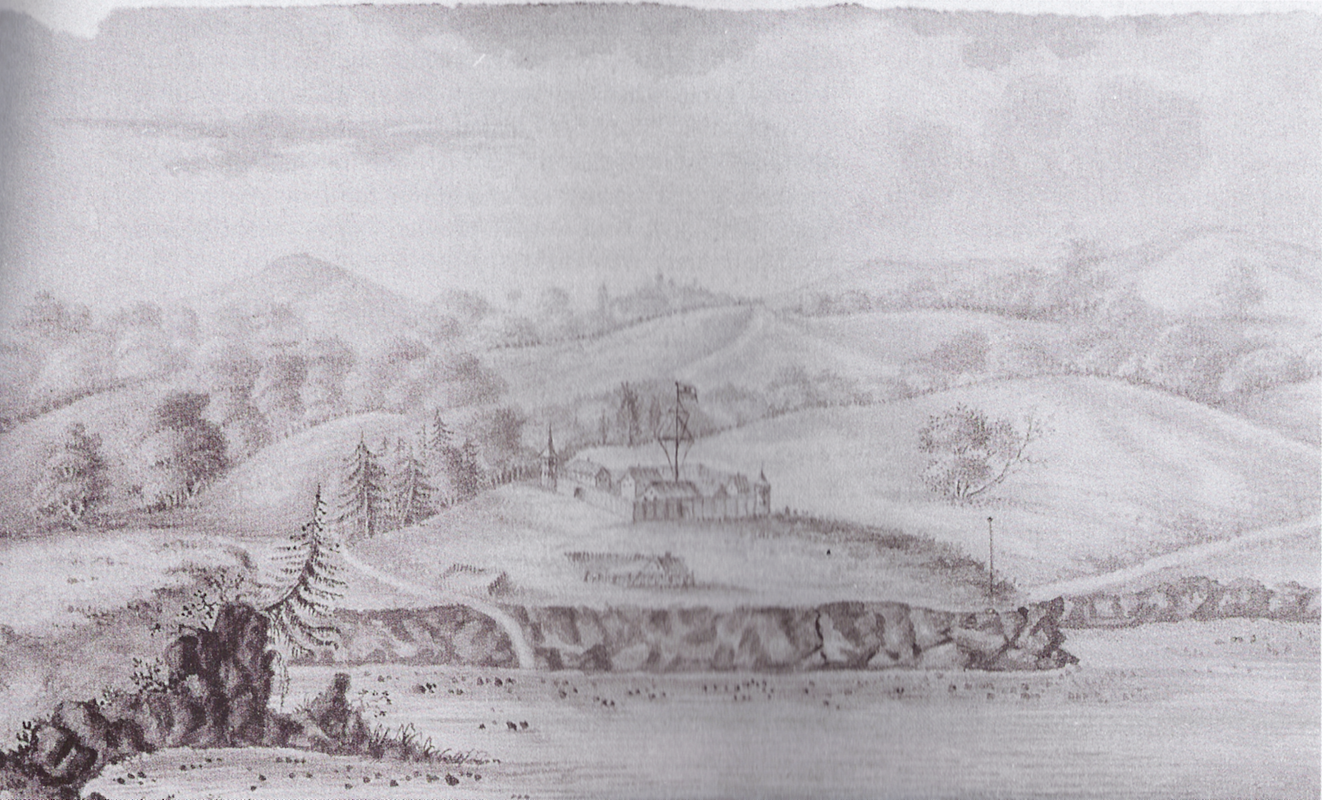
A drawing of Fort Ross in 1817 when it was only a few years old

Documentation on Tarakanov's activities in the early 1810s is incomplete. While Kuskov remained at Fort Ross, Tarakanov returned to Sitka at least once. In January 1814 he was given command of a party of about 60 Alutiiq sea otter hunters sent from Sitka to California on the Il'mena, a New England ship bought by the RAC during the War of 1812 when Americans feared their ships being captured by the British. The Il'mena sailed under command of the American captain William Wadsworth, who was working for the RAC.

The Il'mena first brought supplies to Fort Ross. From there Il'mena brought hunting parties to the Channel Islands of California, between about Santa Barbara and San Pedro (today part of Los Angeles). The chief hunting overseer, in overall command of the hunting parties, was Tarakanov. He managed several subordinate overseers, such as Iakov Babin. Over a few years multiple RAC hunting parties operated in complex and constantly changing ways throughout the Channel Islands and the nearby mainland coast. It seems that Tarakanov was usually either with a hunting party or base, or on board Il'mena, or at Fort Ross.

At one point Tarakanov and eleven indigenous Alaskan hunters were captured by Spanish authorities near San Pedro. RAC hunters and overseers were captured in other places during this time as well. Prisoners were often transferred around Spanish California in ways that historians have had difficulty documenting in detail. Some hunters were killed by the Spanish or died of illness or some other mishap. Most, including Tarakanov, were eventually released.

The US fur trading vessels Pedler and Forester brought and assisted the RAC hunters in the greater Channel Islands, working with Il'mena at times, having been paid to do so by the RAC. It is possible that Tarakanov was on board one or both of these vessels sometime during this period.

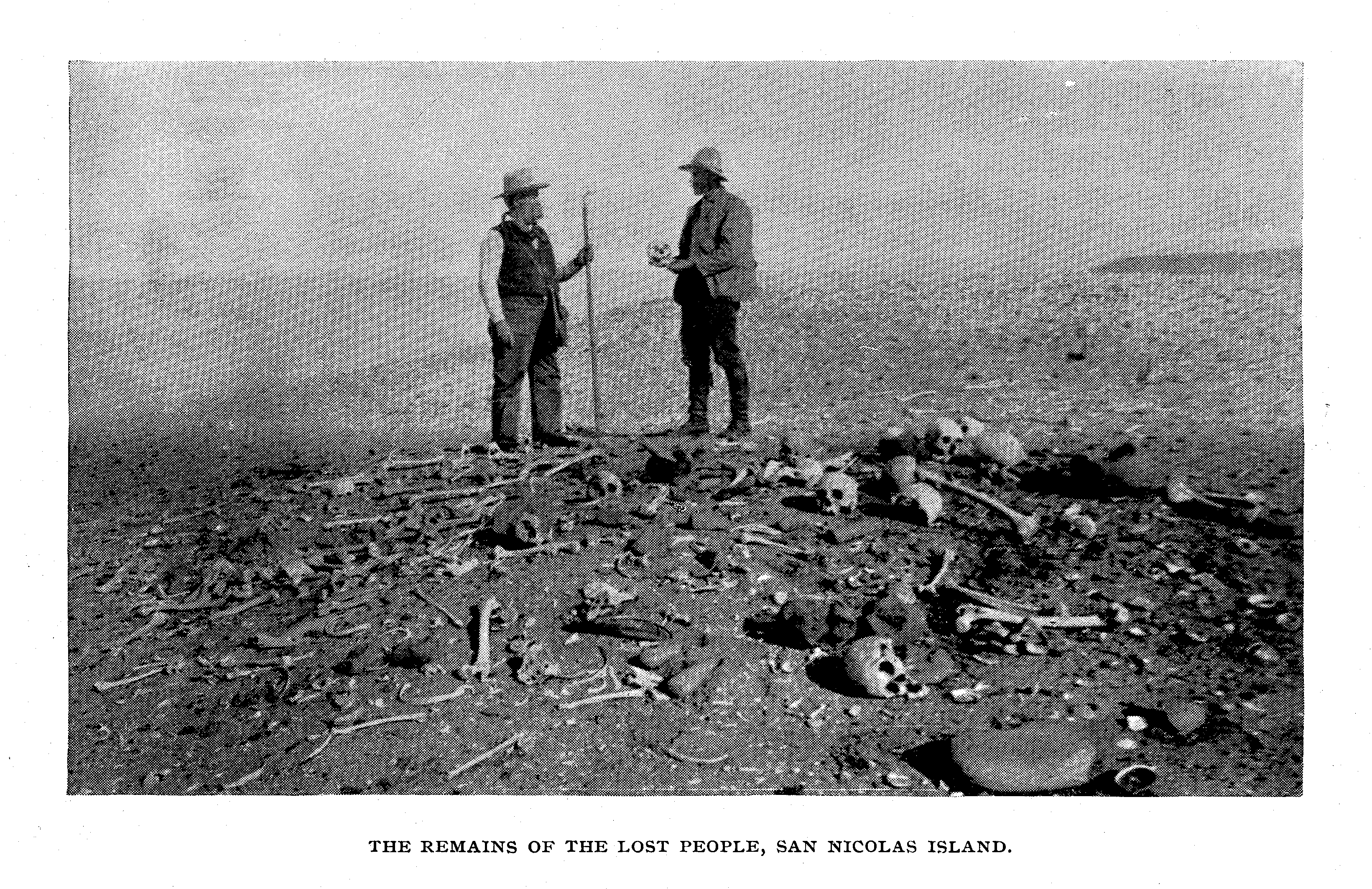
1896 image of Nicoleño remains on San Nicolas island

During this period of RAC hunting in the Channel Islands, a number of violent incidents were reported up the RAC chain of command. Among these incidents was the massacre of the Nicoleño people of San Nicolas Island by RAC hunters under Iakov Babin in the summer of 1814. Babin claimed it was in revenge for a Nicoleño killing one of Babin's hunters, but Tarakanov was doubtful and higher ranking RAC officers were distressed that it had happened at all. This event is relatively well known in California today, because the massacre ultimately resulted in one Nicoleño woman, known as Juana Maria, living alone on San Nicolas Island for many years. And her story became the basis for Scott O'Dell's 1960 children's novel Island of the Blue Dolphins and the 1964 film adaptation Island of the Blue Dolphins.

Il'mena spent the 1814–1815 winter at Bodega Bay, along with most of the otter hunters including Tarakanov and Babin. A preliminary investigation into the massacre was held at Fort Ross. Babin was deemed responsible. In April 1815, at Fort Ross, Tarakanov demoted then fired Babin, replacing him with Boris Tarasov. Reports of the massacre were sent far up the RAC chain of command, eventually reaching the main offices in Saint Petersburg, the capital of the Russian Empire. It took several years, but in 1818 RAC Chief Manager Ludwig von Hagemeister, ordered Iakov Babin to be taken to Sitka, then to Saint Petersburg to be held accountable for the Nicoleño massacre.

== Tarakanov in Hawaii ==
In early 1816 at Fort Ross, while the Channel Islands hunting operations were still ongoing, Tarakanov and one of his hunting parties boarded Il'mena, bound for Sitka under the American captain and RAC employee William Wadsworth. Once well at sea, Captain Wadsworth discovered the Il'mena was leaking badly and was in danger. Repairs at Fort Ross had been mediocore and slow at best, and the voyage to Sitka was dangerous, so Wadsworth decided to sail to the Hawaiian Islands instead, a quicker and safer voyage to a pleasant place where repairs would be easier than at either Fort Ross or Sitka.

The unplanned diversion of Il'mena to Hawaii resulted in Tarakanov becoming embroiled in the Schäffer affair. This was a complicated series of events between 1815 and 1817. Georg Anton Schäffer, a German physician who was working for the RAC, was assigned by Baranov to go to the Hawaiian Islands and recover the cargo, or equivalent compensation, of the ship Bering, which had wrecked at Waimea, on the island of Kauai. Kaumualiʻi was the aliʻi nui (ruler) of Kauai, but since 1810 had been a reluctant vassal of Kamehameha I, the monarch of the Kingdom of Hawaii.

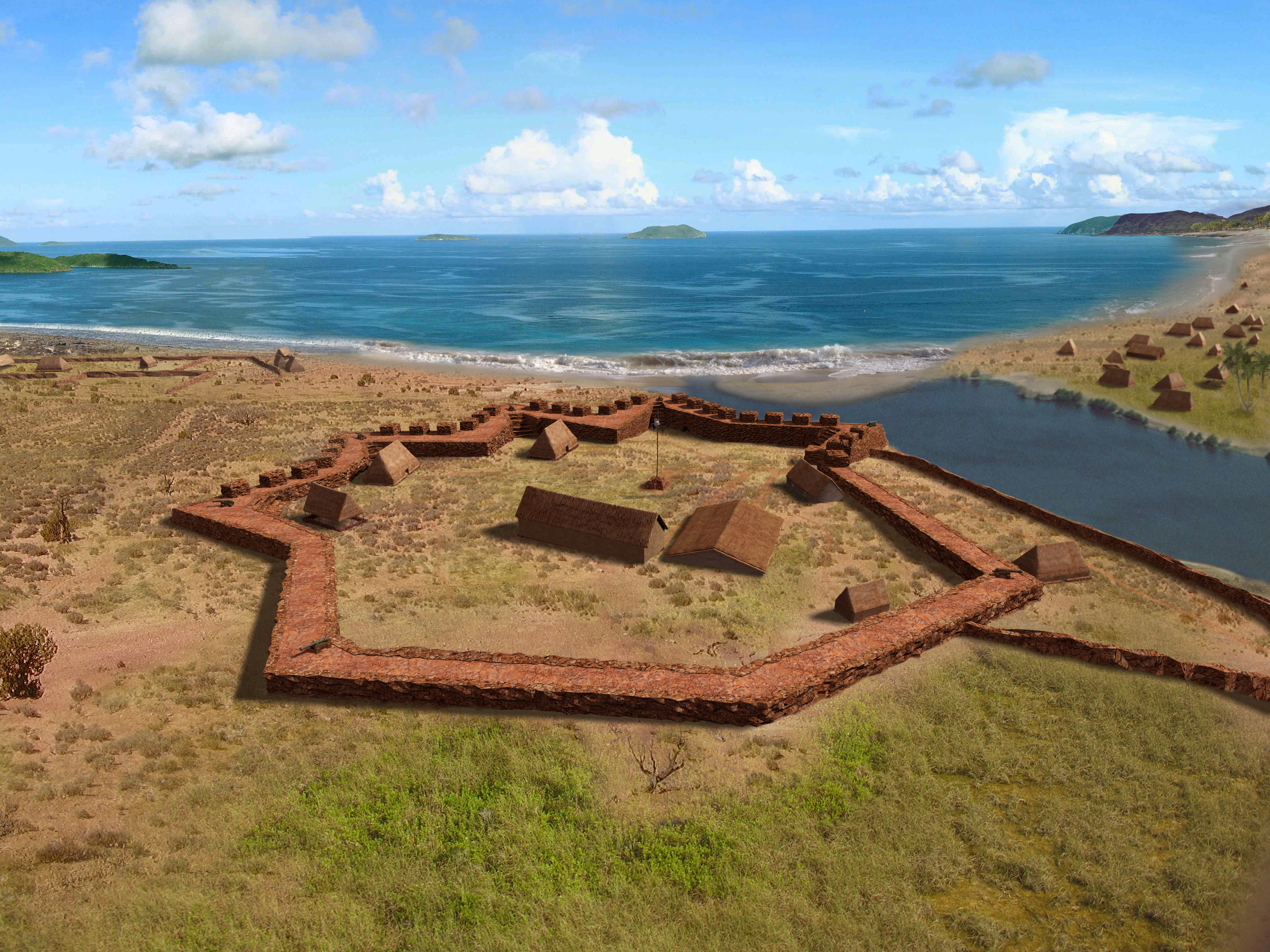
Artist's impression of Fort Elizabeth

In May 1816, Kaumualiʻi, seeking freedom from Kamehameha's overlordship, agreed to become a protectorate of Russia. A written report of the event was composed by Tarakanov and others. Kaumualiʻi also gave permission for three RAC forts on Kauai. Fort Elizabeth, was built with stone at the mouth of the Waimea River. The other two, Fort Alexander and Fort Barclay-de-Tolly were smaller earthen works. Tarakanov was involved in building and operating Fort Elizabeth. Schäffer also assigned Tarakanov to deliver letters to Kaumualiʻi and engage in diplomatic negotiations.

As the alliance between Kaumualiʻi and Schäffer grew stronger over 1816, Kaumualiʻi and other Kauai nobility made many land grants and other gifts to RAC, Schäffer, Tarakanov, and others. Among other gifts, Tarakanov was granted a village with eleven Native Hawaiian families on the left bank of the Hanapēpē River. The various grants were voided when the Schäffer affair fell apart. Nevertheless, for a short period, Tarakanov had been granted status akin to Hawaiian nobility while still being a Russian serf.

For various complicated reasons, Kaumualiʻi turned against Schäffer and the RAC. Schäffer tried to make a stand at Fort Elizabeth but was forced to flee to Honolulu, Oahu. Tarakanov and others on Kauai joined him on board Kad'iak, which barely made it to Honolulu and became stuck in the harbor. Native Hawaiians and Americans in Honolulu would not allow the Russians to disembark unless Schäffer surrendered for arrest. He refused and a standoff ensued.

In July 1817 the American Isaiah Lewis, captain of the Panther, offered to take Schäffer away from Hawaii. This would end the "affair" but allow Schäffer to avoid arrest and escape to Europe. Schäffer put the question to his men on Kad'iak. Tarakanov and others urged him to take the deal and leave. On 7 July 1817 Schäffer left for China, then Europe, on Panther. He left behind a committee, headed by Tarakanov, to look after Kad'iak and the many remaining RAC employees and goods on Kauai, Oahu, and other Hawaiian islands. Also on 7 July, just before Schäffer departed, a letter asking for reinforcements and military aid was written. It was signed by Schäffer, Tarakanov, Captain Lewis, and others.

After Schäffer left and those on Kad'iak were freed, Tarakanov took charge of salvaging the situation. He prepared an inventory of RAC property, including the land grants on Kauai. Still having a cordial relation with most American shipmasters in Hawaii, Tarakanov was able to make a deal with Captain Myrick of the Cossack to take two Russians and 41 indigenous Alaskan hunters from Oahu to Sitka. Payment for the trip was secured by stopping in California and hunting sea otters for the American shipmaster. Tarakanov himself returned to Sitka in December 1817 on board the American ship Eagle, under William Heath Davis Sr.

In January 1818 the RAC officer and Russian Naval officer Ludwig von Hagemeister, who had arrived in Sitka in early 1817, took over as the RAC's Chief Manager and governor of Russian America. Baranov was dismissed and left Alaska, but died on the voyage. When Tarakanov arrived in Sitka in December 1817, Hagemeister had already replaced Baranov. Tarakanov had had a good relationship with Baranov, but the much more elitist and autocratic Hagermeister found fault with Tarakanov. Hagermeister believed Tarakanov had not had the authority to make deals with American captains that involving hunting sea otters for them, and reprimanded him for acting "contrary to instructions from superiors". But Hagermeister needed Tarakanov to help repair the situation in Hawaii. In February 1818, on Hagermeister's orders, Tarakanov accompanied Fleet Lieutenant I.A. Podushkin, captain of Otkrytie, to the Hawaiian Islands with the goal of reestablishing friendly relations with Kamehameha, and to recover as much RAC property as they could. Hagermeister's instructions to Podushkin make it clear he did not trust Tarakanov and thought him careless and unreliable. The results of his voyage were reported by Hagermeister in August 1818. All RAC personnel apart from a few deserters were returned to Sitka, but none of the property was recovered. The land grants were void. The Kad'iak was abandoned to slowly rot in Honolulu's harbor. A few small items, like the rigging of Kad'iak were recovered. But the overall financial loss of the Schäffer Affair was calculated at over 200,000 rubles, an enormous sum for that time.

== Later life ==
In 1817, when Tarakanov was in Hawaii a ship arrived with the news that the Russian government had approved Tarakanov's manumission from serfdom. A few years earlier he had petitioned for emancipation, probably with Baranov's support. The official ceremony that released him from serfdom had to wait until 1818 when Tarakanov was back in Sitka.

After the Schäffer Affair and Baranov's dismissal, documentation about Tarakanov is sparse. Like many in the RAC, including Baranov himself, Tarakanov married an indigenous woman. She was a Koniag Alutiiq woman. Her Russian baptismal name was Alexandra. They were married in Sitka in 1818. Tarakanov's son Aleksey (also transliterated Alexei) was born in Sitka on 27 February 1819.

Tarakanov continued to work for the RAC through 1819. One of his last jobs in North America was leading a hunting party of about 80 kayaks in the Cross Sound and Glacier Bay areas, assisted by the vessel Finlandiia. Since the Alexander Archipelago had been overhunted for decades, the results were poor, less than 300 otter skins. Whether Tarakanov decided to retire after this, or Hagermeister wanted to get rid of him, or possibly both, is not known. Whatever the case, after the 1819 hunt, Hagermeister sent Tarakanov to Saint Petersburg to report to the RAC directors about the Schäffer affair in Hawaii. The official dispatch noted "[Tarakanov] is of no use to us here".

Very little is known about Tarakanov after this, except that he returned to Russia from Alaska in 1819–1820, and settled in Kursk, his original home.

Little is known about his life after his return to Russia. Archives in Kursk show that he was ranked in the Kursk middle class society, no longer a serf. Kursk records also suggest he left Kursk sometime before 1834, without any indication of where he might have gone, how long, or why.

== See also ==
- California fur rush
- History of the west coast of North America
- Maritime history of California
- Russian colonization of North America
