= Zia (novel) =

Novel by Scott O'Dell

- Cover of first edition
- Author: Scott O'Dell
- Illustrator: Ted Lewin
- Genre: Realistic Fiction
- Published: 1976 (Houghton Mifflin)
- Media type: Print (Hardcover and Paperback)
- Pages: 192pp (hardcover & paperback edition)
- ISBN: 978-0-395-24393-0 (hardcover edition)
- OCLC: 1976107
- LC Class: PZ7.O237 Zi
- Preceded by: Island of the Blue Dolphins

Zia is the sequel to the award-winning Island of the Blue Dolphins by Scott O'Dell. It was published in 1976, 16 years after the publication of the first novel.

== Plot ==
Zia is the 14-year-old niece of Karana, the Nicoleño woman left behind on the Island of the Blue Dolphins in the previous book. Zia believes her aunt Karana to be alive, and with the help of her younger brother Mando, Zia sets out twice in an 18-foot boat on what are, ultimately, unsuccessful attempts at rescuing Karana. There is evidence on the island that she is still there, including small footprints in the sand, signs of cooking fires, and the remains of huts. So, then Zia goes to Santa Barbara to get an even better chance of finding her aunt.

Captain Nidever sails to the Island of the Blue Dolphins to hunt otters, bringing Father Vicente with him to find Karana. Meanwhile, Stone Hands, planning an escape for himself and the other Native Americans living at the mission, gives Zia the key to the girls' dormitory room. She unlocks the dormitory, and Captain Cordova puts Zia in prison, believing she was the instigator of the escape.

Captain Nidever returns with Karana and her second dog, Rontu Aru. Captain Cordova and Father Vicente argue, and finally free Zia from prison. Zia and Karana cannot communicate, although Karana appears to be settling into society. She learns to weave baskets as the other Mission Indians do, loves melons, and is fascinated by the horses, of which there were none on her island. Originally, Karana is assigned to sleep in the women's dormitory, but Rontu Aru is separated from her and chained up in the courtyard, as the priests believe that he is bringing fleas into the dormitory. Karana, unaccustomed to the company of others and missing her dog, moves out to the courtyard.

Father Merced becomes very ill and dies, and Father Vicente takes over. He lets people sell the things that they make and allows them to keep the money. While Father Vicente is in charge of the mission, he goes with Karana and Zia to bring Stone Hands back from the canyon where the Native people tried to make a new home after they left the mission. When the church leadership sends Father Malatesta to be the new leader of the mission, Father Vicente leaves and goes to Monterey Bay. Stone Hands, Karana, and the others do not like Father Malatesta. Karana leaves the mission not long later when Father Malatesta does not allow her to sleep on the floor with Rontu-Aru. In the spring, Stone Hands and many of the Native people run away again because of the harsh treatment, and this time Mando leaves with him.

Karana had been living in the same cave in which she and Mando had hidden the boat they found at the beginning of the book. On the day that Stone Hands and Mando leave the mission, Zia visits Karana again. She finds that Karana is very sick, but the priests at the mission will not help because Karana will not live there and work for the mission. In the morning, Karana dies. Zia then leaves the Mission and returns to her old home in the mountains with Rontu-Aru at her side.

== Historical elements ==
Zia's aunt, Karana, who was the main character of Island of the Blue Dolphins, is based on Juana Maria, a Nicoleño woman who lived alone on an island for 18 years.

Captain George Nidever was the name of the real person who brought Juana Maria from her island to a mission.

== Reception ==
Kirkus Reviews saw that "Zia's narrative continues the laconic precision and sober beauty we remember from Island of Blue Dolphins."

== Editions ==
- Houghton Mifflin, 1976, ISBN 0-395-24393-9 (1st edition)
- Laurel Leaf, 1978, ISBN 0-440-99904-9 (paperback)
- Yearling, 1995, ISBN 0-440-41001-0 (paperback)
- Laurel Leaf, 1995, ISBN 0-440-21956-6 (paperback reprint)
- Rebound by Sagebrush, 1999, ISBN 0-88103-880-6 (school/library binding)
