= George Nidever =

American explorer (1802–1883)

- Born: December 20, 1802; Tennessee, U.S.
- Died: March 24, 1883 (aged 80); Santa Barbara, California, U.S.
- Occupations: explorer, fur trapper, memoirist and sailor

George Nidever (also spelled Nidiver; December 20, 1802 – March 24, 1883) was an American mountain man, explorer, fur trapper, memoirist and sailor. In the 1830s he became one of the first wave of American settlers to move to Mexican California, where he made his living in fur trapping. In 1853 he led the expedition that rescued Juana Maria, the last member of the Nicoleño people, from San Nicolas Island where she had been living alone for eighteen years. Toward the end of his life Nidever wrote a memoir, Life and Adventures of George Nidever, which was popular at the end of the 19th century.

== Adventures ==
Nidever was born in Eastern Tennessee, and was of German descent. At 28 he joined a hunting and trapping party in 1830 at Fort Smith, Arkansas that also included Isaac Graham and Job Francis Dye; after a year spent adventuring from Missouri to Texas the core of the party reached Taos in 1831. That fall they set out for the headwaters of the Arkansas River. Nidever took part in the battle of Pierre's Hole. From there the original Fort Smith group broke up, and in July 1832 Nidever joined Joseph Reddford Walker and accompanied him to California in 1833. Remaining there, he joined George C. Yount in a sea otter hunt which had some success. From Santa Barbara he renewed sea otter hunting, pursuing that profession, along with farming and Pacific piloting for the remainder of his life. He married California native María Sinforosa Ramona Sanchez (1812–1892), whose family owned the 14,000 acre Rancho Santa Clara del Norte, at Mission Santa Barbara in 1841.

At the end of the Mexican–American War, Nidever joined John C. Frémont at Santa Barbara in 1846 and accompanied him as interpreter to Campo de Cahuenga, where the Treaty of Cahuenga was signed, ending the war. Nidever tried the gold fields briefly, but without much success, and ranched for a time on San Miguel Island.

== Juana Maria ==
In 1850, Father Gonzales of the Mission Santa Barbara paid one Thomas Jeffries $200 to find Juana Maria, the last member of the Nicoleño people who had been inadvertently left behind when the rest of her tribe was evacuated from San Nicolas Island in 1835. Jeffries was unsuccessful, but the tales he told upon returning to San Francisco captured Nidever's imagination, and he launched several expeditions of his own. In 1853, after two unsuccessful attempts, one of Nidever's men, Carl Dittman, discovered human footprints on the beach and pieces of seal blubber which had been left out to dry. Further investigation lead to Juana Maria's discovery; she was living in a crude hut partially constructed of whale bones, and wearing a dress made of greenish cormorant feathers.

Afterward Juana Maria was taken to the Mission Santa Barbara, but was unable to communicate with anyone, even the local Chumash Indians. She stayed with the Nidevers upon her return to civilization, but contracted dysentery and died only a few weeks later. Her life was chronicled with very heavy artistic liberty in the classic children's novel Island of the Blue Dolphins.

== Later life ==
Nidever dictated his memoir to Edward F. Murray in 1878, The Life and Adventures of George Nidever, towards the end of his life. His story was popular; an episode in which he killed one grizzly bear with a single shot and then stared down another became the subject of a ballad. The ballad so impressed Ralph Waldo Emerson that he supplemented his essay "Courage" from his Society and Solitude with a transcription of its lyrics. Nidever died in 1883 and was buried at Calvary Catholic Cemetery Santa Barbara.
