= Il'mena =

Merchant ship

History

United States
- Name: Lydia
- Fate: Sold to Russian–American Company, December 1813

Russia (Russian–American Company)
- Name: Il'mena or Ilmena or Il'men'
- Acquired: December 1813
- Fate: Wrecked on the coast of California in 1820.

General characteristics
- Class & type: Brig
- Tons burthen: 50 tons (bm), or 200 tons (bm)
- Propulsion: Sails
- Sail plan: Brig

Lydia was a US merchant ship that sailed on maritime fur trading ventures in the early 1800s. In December 1813 it was sold to the Russian–American Company and renamed Il'mena, also spelled Ilmena and Il'men' (Russian: Ильмена). As both Lydia and Il'mena it was involved in notable events. Today it is best known for its role in an 1814 massacre of the Nicoleño natives of San Nicolas Island, which ultimately resulted in one Nicoleño woman, known as Juana Maria, living alone on the island for many years. These events became the basis for Scott O'Dell's 1960 children's novel Island of the Blue Dolphins and the 1964 film adaptation Island of the Blue Dolphins.

The vessel was a brig built in the East Indies of teak. In April 1809 Lydia, under captain Thomas Brown, left Boston for the Pacific Northwest Coast. In 1810 Brown rescued the Russian survivors of Sv. Nikolai ("St. Nicholas"), which had wrecked on the Olympic Peninsula in November 1808. They were taken aboard Lydia and brought to Sitka, the capital of Russian America. In October 1811 Thomas Brown exchanged commands with James Bennett of Derby. In late 1813 Bennett took Lydia to Sitka where the vessel was sold to the Russian–American Company (RAC) and renamed Il'mena.

As an RAC vessel Il'mena, under captain William Wadsworth, brought Aleuts with their kayaks and baidarkas to California to hunt sea otters along the coast of California, in 1814. During this time an altercation with the Nicoleño of San Nicolas Island resulted in a massacre of the Nicoleño. In addition some of the RAC employees were captured by the authorities of Spanish California, who considered their activity poaching.

From September 1815 to April 1816 Il'mena was laid up at Bodega Bay for repairs. The vessel was taken to the Hawaiian Islands in 1816, where it became involved in the Schäffer affair before leaving in June 1817 under captain George Young. By late June 1817 Il’mena was back at Sitka. In 1820 Il'mena wrecked at Point Arena on the coast of California. All the people and cargo on board were saved and taken to nearby Fort Ross.

== American vessel Lydia ==
Lydia was a brig built in the East Indies of teak. By 1804 it was owned by Theodore Lyman and Associates of Boston. By 1809 Lyman was joined in ownership by James & Thomas Handasyd Perkins (J. & T.H. Perkins).

Sources differ over the size of the vessel. Some sources say it was 200 tons, while others say 50 tons.

In April 1809 the brig was sent from Boston on a maritime fur trade voyage to the Pacific Northwest, under Captain Thomas Brown. Lydia spent 1810 to 1813 cruising the Northwest Coast, between about the Columbia River and Sitka Sound, trading with the indigenous peoples of the Pacific Northwest Coast for sea otter furs, which commanded a high price in China.

In 1810 Captain Brown rescued the Russian survivors of Sv. Nikolai ("St. Nicholas"), which had wrecked near Rialto Beach on the Olympic Peninsula on 1 November 1808. The survivors, led by Timofei Nikitich Tarakanov, lived with the Hoh and Makah in a servile way until rescued by Brown. One of the Russian survivors from Nikolai was on board Lydia, having been sold as a slave to the south and acquired by Captain Brown on the Columbia River. Later Brown visited the Makah village at Neah Bay where on 22 May he arranged to purchase the Russians enslaved there. They were taken aboard Lydia and brought to Sitka, the capital of Russian America.

Sometime in 1811 Captain Thomas Brown exchanged commands with James Bennett of the Derby, another Boston–based maritime fur trading vessel, also owned by J. & T.H. Perkins along with James Lamb and Thomas Lamb (J. & T. Lamb Company), William F. Sturgis, and others.

During the War of 1812 American captains in the Hawaiian Islands, worried about the possibility of British warships, sold the maritime fur trading vessels Atahualpa and Lydia to Alexander Baranov, governor of the Russian-American Company (RAC). Lydia was sold to the RAC in December 1813 for 46,000 seal skins. About the same time Atahualpa was sold as well. The Lydia was renamed Il'mena (or Ilmena), and the Atahualpa was renamed Bering (or Behring).

== Russian vessel Il'mena ==
After agreeing to sell Lydia to Alexander Baranov and the RAC, James Bennett took Lydia to Sitka where in late December 1813 the sale was finalized and Lydia renamed Il'mena.

=== Il'mena in California ===
In 1814 Baranov sent Il'mena, under the American captain William Wadsworth, with supplies to the Russian outpost of Fort Ross in California. From there Il'mena spent the summer of 1814 engaged in poaching Californian sea otters, a practice that had been established several years earlier. For this purpose Il'mena had brought a party of about 50 Aleut hunters with their kayaks and baidarkas, under the RAC promyshlenniki overseers Timofei Nikitich Tarakanov and Iakov Babin. Also on board and serving as supercargo and pilot was João Elliot de Castro, who had been physician to King Kamehameha I of the Hawaiian Kingdom, but had gone to Alaska and was employed by Baranov because of his knowledge of Spanish and the Spanish missions in California. At one point Tarakanov and eleven Aleuts were captured by Spanish authorities near San Pedro (today part of Los Angeles). The US fur trading vessels Pedler and Forester assisted the RAC hunters brought by Il'mena, having been paid to do so by the RAC.

The Russian hunters operated in multiple places over several years, focusing on the Channel Islands near Santa Barbara and Los Angeles. A number of violent incidents were reported up the RAC chain of command. Among these incidents was the 1814 massacre of the Nicoleño people of San Nicolas Island by RAC Aleut hunters under Iakov Babin. This occurred during the summer of 1814, allegedly in revenge for the Nicoleño killing one of Babin's hunters. Il'mena spent the 1814–1815 winter at Bodega Bay, along with most of the otter hunters including Babin.

Babin was held responsible for the massacre. In April 1815, at Bodega Bay, the chief hunting supervisor, Timofei Tarakanov, demoted then fired Babin, replacing him with Boris Tarasov. Babin was taken to Sitka and eventually required to go to Saint Petersburg, the capital of the Russian Empire, to stand trial for the Nicoleño massacre.

In late April 1815 a group of RAC sea otter hunters, under Boris Tarasov, were taken by the Forester back to San Nicolas Island to continue hunting otters. Tarasov was disappointed by the hunt and decided to move the group, using kayaks and baidarkas, to Santa Rosa Island, then Santa Catalina Island, then to the mainland. In September, near San Pedro (now part of Los Angeles) they were captured by Spanish authorities and taken to the Pueblo of Los Angeles. Some of the hunters were imprisoned there, while Tarasov and others were taken to Santa Barbara and Monterey.

One of the hunters imprisoned in Los Angeles, Ivan Kyglaia, later provided eyewitness testimony of the torture and murder of fellow Aleut hunter Chukagnak, by order of a Spanish priest. Kyglaia said the priest wanted the Aleuts to renounce the Russian Orthodox Church and accept Catholicism. Although some Aleuts did so, Chukagnak and Kyglaia refused, leading to the torture and murder of Chukagnak. Kyglaia expected the same treatment but, according to Kyglaia, the priest received a letter and instead had Kyglaia transferred to Santa Barbara.

Around the same time Il'mena was cruising among the Channel Islands with Alexander Baranov's son, Antipatr Alexandrovich Baranov, on board. Antipatr's journal and letters provide additional details about the events of 1815. He describes Il'mena sailing south from San Luis Obispo Bay to Santa Barbara, with stops at El Cojo and Rancho Nuestra Señora del Refugio. Despite being warned by José María Ortega not to come ashore due to the presence of Spanish soldiers, some of the crew of Il'mena landed at El Cojo where they were apprehended by Spanish troops. Captain Wadsworth and three others escaped but supercargo Elliot de Castro, Osip Volkov, and five others were taken to Santa Barbara, then Monterey. Although imprisoned, Elliot de Castro wrote letters to Il’mena, which the Spanish delivered. Information passed between Il'mena and Elliot de Castro, but eventually it was clear that Il'mena could do nothing further and so sailed to retrieve the hunting parties on the Channel Islands, arriving at San Nicolas Island on 1 October 1815. This was the vessel's last visit to San Nicolas Island until 1819.

After Chukagnak was killed in Los Angeles Kyglaia was transferred to Santa Barbara. He was imprisoned with another group of captured Aleuts. Kyglaia and another Aleut, Filip Atash'sha, managed to escape in a baidarka. They paddled to San Pedro, then among several Channel Islands until reaching San Nicolas Island. They found no RAC employees there, only the Nicoleño who had survived the 1814 massacre. With the help of the Nicoleño Kyglaia and Atash'sha lived on the island from about 1817 to 1819, hoping the Il'mena or some other friendly vessel would return. Atash'sha died before one came. In the spring of 1819 Il'mena visited the island again and rescued Kyglaia, who was taken to Fort Ross. There he was interviewed by Ivan Kuskov, after which the story of Chukagnak's martyrdom spread. Kuskov sent Kyglaia's disposition to his superior, who in turn sent it to the RAC Main Office in St. Petersburg, where it gained the attention of Emperor Alexander I himself. The Emperor had the story of Chukagnak investigated. In time the Church believed Kyglaia's account to be truthful, leading to Chukagnak's canonization as Saint Peter the Aleut. Spanish records corroborate most of the events described by Russian sources, including most of Kyglaia's testimony and the deaths of some Aleuts, but are silent on the possibility of Spanish-ordered torture and murder.

Years later, in 1835, a Mexican ship took the surviving Nicoleño from San Nicolas Island to Santa Barbara. One woman was left behind, who became known as Juana Maria. In 1853 she was found and taken to Santa Barbara, but died within the year. Her story, semi-fictionalized, became well known due to the book Island of the Blue Dolphins and subsequent film adaptation.

=== Il’mena in Hawaii ===
While the various events in California, from 1815 to 1817, played out, Il'mena spent time in the Hawaiian Islands.

In November 1815 Il'mena sailed from Bodega Bay for Sitka, but was damaged at the harbor entrance and returned for more repairs. Il'mena was laid up at Bodega Bay for repairs until April 1816. After the vessel departed Bodega Bay in April a leak was discovered and Captain Wadsworth decided to sail to the Hawaiian Islands for repairs, arriving there in May 1816. Il'mena remained at Honolulu for several months. This was during the 1815–1817 Schäffer affair, when RAC employee Georg Anton Schäffer attempted to conquer the Hawaiian Islands for the RAC and the Russian Empire, during which time Russian Fort Elizabeth was built at Waimea and Fort Alexander at Hanalei, Kauai. Schäffer tried to build an alliance of Native Hawaiians to overthrow King Kamehameha I, but ultimately failed in the face of growing resistance of Native Hawaiians and American traders. In July 1817 Schäffer admitted defeat and left Hawaii.

Il'mena remained at Honolulu from May 1816 to August 1816 while the Schäffer Affair continued under increasing difficulty. Other Russian vessels present in Hawaii around this time included Kad'iak (also spelled Kadiak and Kodiak), under the American captain George Young, and the American schooner Lydia (different from the Lydia that had become Il'mena) under Henry Gyzelaar, who had been hired by the RAC. In August 1816 Schäffer bought Lydia from Gyzelaar, who remained employed as captain. Shortly after the purchase, Lydia and Il'mena, with Schäffer aboard the American ship Avon, under captain Isaac Whittemore, sailed from Honolulu to Hanalei Bay, Kauai, then Fort Elizabeth at Waimea, Kauai. There Schäffer bought Avon and gave Gyzelaar's Lydia to Kaumualii, King of Kauai, in exchange for the valley and port of Hanalei. Il'mena returned to Honolulu. Then on 12 September 1816 Schäffer began construction of Fort Elizabeth, on land donated by Kaumualii.

During September 1816 in Honolulu there was trouble between the Russians and the Native Hawaiians and Americans. The crews of Il'mena and Kad'ak allegedly built a blockhouse in Honolulu, mounted cannons and raised the Russian flag. This alarmed the Native Hawaiians and soon Kamehameha sent a large force, causing the Il'mena and Kad'iak to leave for Kauai.

On 24 September 1816 the American ship O'Cain, under captain Robert McNeil, arrived at Waimea, Kauai, en route to Canton (Guangzhou), China, from the Pacific Northwest Coast. On board as passengers were the experienced fur trading American sea captains Nathan Winship, William Smith, Richard Ebbets, and Henry Gyzelaar, and Doctor Frost. They tried to take down the Russian flag at Fort Elizabeth, but were thwarted by a guard placed by Kaumualii.

Schäffer and Kaumualii, and other Hawaiian chiefs, entered into various agreements in late 1816, including a number of land grants. Schäffer and the RAC was granted Hanalei province. The RAC was given various tracts of land and villages near Waimea, mostly along the Waimea River. Tarakanov, of Il'mena, was given a native village on the Hanapēpē River, Kauai.

In early December 1816 the brig Rurik, under Otto von Kotzebue of the Imperial Russian Navy, with Elliot de Castro on board, arrived at Honolulu. Elliot had been the commissioner of Il'mena until being captured by Spanish authorities in California. He was freed due to intercession by Kotzebue. Despite the presence of Rurik things were becoming increasingly difficult for Schäffer. Captain Wadsworth of Il'mena told Kaumualii that Schäffer intended to arrest him. In retaliation Schäffer had Wadsworth arrested and appointed the pilot Voroll Madson, also an American, to command Il'mena. In addition Native Hawaiians at Hanalei killed a Russian–American Aleut and burned the Russian distillery there.

In January 1817 Schäffer received a letter from Governor Baranov, via the American ship Cossack under Thomas Brown (once captain of Lydia before it became Il'mena). Baranov demanded the return of Il'mena and Kad'iak along with all the capital that had been entrusted to Schäffer, essentially ending Schäffer's work in Hawaii. His last hope lay in the Russian Naval officer Kotzebue and Rurik, therefore he sent Il'mena to Honolulu. But on 6 February 1817 Il'mena returned to Kauai with the news that Rurik had departed. Kotzebue had learned from both Hawaiians, Americans, and others in Honolulu, about Schäffer's actions and decided not to provide Schäffer any support whatever. He sailed from Hawaii on 14 December 1816.

Following this, opposition to Schäffer grew, although the details of how events played out are not entirely clear, but it probably involved Native Hawaiians and a number of American sea captains and merchants, such as Caleb Brintnell, Dixey Wildes, Isaac Whittemore, and William Heath Davis (father of William Heath Davis Jr). On 8 May 1817, at Waimea, Schäffer was seized by Hawaiians and Americans, told that he and all other Russians must leave Kauai immediately, and forced to paddle out to Kad'iak. He waited briefly in the harbor at Waimea, during which time Captain Wadsworth, still a prisoner on Kad'iak, escaped to shore by jumping overboard. Schäffer and his men sailed Kad'iak and Il'mena around the island to Hanalei, hoping to make a stand at Fort Alexander. But it was futile and Schäffer had no choice but to leave.

The Kad'iak was unseaworthy for a voyage to Alaska, so Schäffer gave Captain George Young command of Il'mena and sent him to Governor Baranov in Sitka. Most of the RAC employees in Hawaii left aboard Il'mena. The brig left Hawaii in June and arrived at Sitka near the end of the month. Schäffer himself took command of Kad'iak and sailed to Honolulu where negotiations with the American and Hawaiian opposition ensued. On 7 July 1817 Schäffer sailed for Europe aboard the American vessel Panther, under captain Isaiah Lewis. Tarakanov and 60–100 RAC employees remained in Honolulu to look after the stricken Kad’iak. By January 1818 Tarakanov was back in Sitka. He had hired an American shipmaster to transport two Russians and 41 Aleuts from Oahu to Sitka, paying for their passage by hunting Californian sea otters on the way. Other RAC employees were not able to leave until later in the spring of 1818. The Kad'iak itself remained as a wreck in Honolulu Harbor, still visible in November 1818 when Vasily Golovnin arrived on Kamchatka.

=== Rescue of Kyglaia ===
In the spring of 1819 Il'mena sailed from Sitka to California, again bringing sea otter hunting parties. Il'mena stopped at San Nicolas Island to drop off a party of hunters, and Kyglaia was finally able to leave the island and return to RAC establishments, after being marooned there for over three years.

Despite the massacre of most of the Nicoleño by Aleut hunters in 1814, Kyglaia reported that he and Atash’sha had been well treated by them, even saying that the Nicoleño were "happy of their arrival and their stay on the island". Kyglaia and Atash'sha arrived on the island in late 1815 and stayed until the spring of 1819, although Atash'sha died sometime in 1816. Kyglaia reported that two Spanish ships visited the island in the fall of 1818 and Spaniards came ashore, but the Nicoleño helped hide Kyglaia. The ships were likely not Spanish but rather the Santa Rosa and La Argentina of the French privateer Hippolyte Bouchard, who may have been flying Spanish flags as a ruse.

== Fate ==
In 1820 Il'mena again sailed south from Sitka to California. On 19 June 1820 Il'mena wrecked at Point Arena on the coast of California, due to carelessness of Christopher Stevens, the vessel's American navigator. All the people and cargo on board were saved and taken to nearby Fort Ross.

== See also ==
- List of historical ships in British Columbia
- List of shipwrecks of California
