= Russian schooner Nikolai =

History
- Name: Nikolai
- Owner: Russian-American Company
- Fate: Ran aground November 1808 on James Island

General characteristics
- Type: Schooner
- Complement: 22

Nikolai (Russian: Николай) was a schooner of the Russian-American Company (RAC) sent by Chief Manager Alexander Baranov to the Oregon Country in November 1808. The schooner was named in honor of Saint Nicholas (Святой Николай, Svyatoi Nikolai); it is sometimes referred to as Sv. Nikolai.

During a storm she ran aground on the Olympic Peninsula. The crew quickly faced hostilities from the Hoh nation. Many of the crew became the willing slaves of the Makah nation after Makah nobles agreed to free them when the next European vessel entered the Strait of Juan de Fuca. An American ship visited Neah Bay in the spring of 1810 and the RAC employees were freed and returned to Novo-Arkhangelsk.

The failure of the vessel to locate a suitable location for a potential station in the Oregon Country made RAC officials refocus efforts and eventually establish Fort Ross in Alta California. During their time marooned on the Olympic Peninsula, seven of the crew died.

== Dispatched south ==
The Nikolai was originally made in the Kingdom of Hawaiʻi for Kamehameha I and purchased for 150 sea otter skins. Baranov "ordered [the Nikolai] to explore the coast south of Vancouver Island, barter with the natives for sea otter pelts, and if possible discover a site for a permanent Russian post in the Oregon Country." The vessel had a complement of 22, including Russian promyshlenniki, an Englishman and seven Alutiiq.

On 13 November [O.S. 1 November], a gale with large waves stranded the ship on a beach north of the Quillayute River and James Island. As with other RAC shipwrecks of the period, a mixture of officer incompetence, poorly trained crew, challenging weather, and low quality ship construction likely converged to cause the accident.

Members of the Hoh nation arrived that day, inspecting the stranded ship. As the Hohs investigated the Russian property, Timofei Nikitich Tarakanov, an officer, instructed the promyshlenniki to peaceably remove the Hoh from their camp. Communication with the Hoh was commenced through Chinook Jargon. Despite the peaceable intentions of Tarakanov, a Russian-instigated skirmish quickly arose. Three Hohs were killed and many of the Nikolai crew were injured by rocks and spears.

== Crew marooned ==
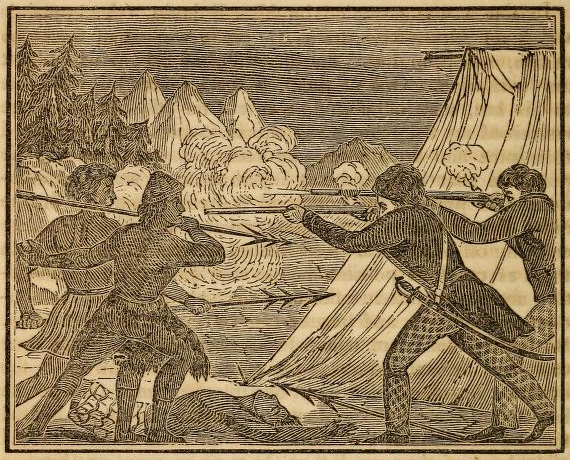
The Russians from the Russian American Company's ship St Nicholai are attacked by the natives

In the aftermath of the fighting, the promyshlenniki "took two guns and a pistol, and we loaded all the boxes of cartridges, three kegs of powder" along with the remaining supply of provisions, and destroyed the remaining armaments aboard the ship. The party left the area for Grays Harbor, where the Nikolai was to rendezvous with another RAC ship. They continually monitored by Hoh scouts as they north traveled along the coast.

On 19 November [O.S. 7 November] they reached the Hoh river mouth, 14 miles (23 km) from the wreck site. The principal Hoh village was adjacent to the riverbank opposite of the Nikolai crew. Two canoes ferried a portion of the crew the next day. The larger vessel was intentionally sunk by Hoh canoemen in the middle of the Hoh river. The seven Russians on the canoe swam back to the bank where the remaining group was. Another battle ensued, with one Russian receiving a fatal wound from a spear. The Hoh kept the four passengers on the other canoe, two Alaska Natives, one of the promyshlenniki, and Anna Bulygina, the 18-year-old wife of expedition commander Nikolai Bulygin, as hostages.

After this incident the free Nikolai staff began to aimlessly wander through the coastal forests. In despair from losing his wife, Bulygin appointed Tarakanov to lead the remaining party. Starvation quickly became an issue, temporarily allayed when a village was found on 27 November [O.S. 15 November]. The lodges were abandoned outside of one teenager, who informed them of the inhabitants fleeing upon becoming aware of their presence. Everyone present from the crew stole fish found at the village. An estimated 25 native warriors tracked down them soon after. While none of the crew were grievously injured in the ensuing fight, it pushed them into the interior.

Another small village was eventually located, though the locals were not receptive to offering the large amount of supplies needed by the party. The natives were forced to accept a commercial transaction. In return for glass and metal beads, they traded bags of salmon and roe. The crew continued to search for a suitable location to create a cabin to weather the winter season. Eventually a small group of natives visited the shelter and the Russians took the son of a noble captive. The Russians demanded 400 salmon and 10 bags of roe for his release.

A band of 70 natives during the next week delivered the provisions along with a canoe, with the Russians in return giving the noble several trinkets of clothing as a measure of goodwill. Bulygin resumed command of the party and they departed from the cabin on 8 February 1809. The party was led by a local to a river where individuals connected to the seizure of four party members were sighted. Two natives were taken hostage and the Nikolai crew demanded the return of their people. The Russians were informed that a neighboring chieftain had purchased the four people, but relatives of the native hostages agreed to work for their return.

== Enslaved ==
A week later a band of 50 Makah arrived, with Anna Bulygina among them. Anna stated that while she was a slave, Yutramaki, her owner, "was an upright and virtuous man, widely known along the coast. He honestly would set us free and send us to the two European ships cruising along the Straits of Juan de Fuca." The majority of the group agreed to become slaves, and were traded among nobles in several villages. The remaining party members were soon after forcibly enslaved by natives. Over the winter of 1809–1810 several promyshlenniki fled their masters for Yutramaki as they faced starvation.

The Makah noble initially refused to return the Russians, but Tarakanov made their owners agree to better feed them. On 18 May [O.S. 6 May] 1810 an American maritime fur trade vessel, Lydia under Thomas Brown of Boston, visited Yutramakai's village on Neah Bay. On board was a Russian from Nikolai, having previously been resold south along the Columbia River. Captain Brown worked with Yutramakai to free the dispersed Nikolai, and they were purchased by Brown by 22 May [O.S. 10 May]. Lydia departed for Novo-Arkhangelsk and arrived there on 9 June.

== Assessment ==
When Tarakanov and the remaining crew returned to Novo-Arkhangelsk, his report to Baranov was influential in determining future company operations. The inhospitable picture given by Tarakanov led to future expansion efforts focused on Alta California, with Fort Ross founded in 1812. As historian Alton S. Donnelly reported,

"Tarakanov and his shipmates had not found a good harbor. They did not discover rich, untapped fur resources. Nor did they meet any Indian nations eager to do the Russians' bidding as clients of the Company... The Voyage of the Sv. Nikolai... could not reveal the fertile, open farmlands of the interior country [like the Willamette Valley]... Neither Baranov nor his successors took any further real interest in the Oregon Country after 1810."

== Bibliography ==
- Andrews, C.L. (January 1922). "The Wreck of the St. Nicholas". The Washington Historical Quarterly. 13 (1). University of Washington: 27–31. JSTOR 40473584.
- Donnelly, Alton S. (1985). Owens, Kenneth N. (ed.). The Wreck of the Sv. Nikolai. Portland, OR: The Press of the Oregon Historical Society. ISBN 9780875951256.
- Grinëv, Andrei V. (Fall 2011). "Russian Maritime Catastrophes during the Colonization of Alaska, 1741–1867". The Pacific Northwest Quarterly. 102 (4). Translated by Bland, Richard L. University of Washington: 178–194. JSTOR 24624633.
- Owens, Kenneth N. (Autumn 2006). "Frontiersman for the Tsar: Timofei Tarakanov and the Expansion of Russian America". The Magazine of Western History. 56 (3): 3–21. JSTOR 4520817.
