= List of shipwrecks of California =

This is a list of shipwrecks located in Californian waters.

== Del Norte County ==
Ship	Flag	Sunk date	Notes	Coordinates
Brother Jonathan	United States	July 30, 1865	A paddle steamer that ran aground off Crescent City, with the lose of 225 souls. It's the deadliest shipwreck to occur on the Pacific Coast of the United States. Gold was recovered from the wreck in 1996.	
Emidio	United States	December 20, 1941	A tanker that was sunk by I-17 off Crescent City.	41°45′1.96″N 124°11′47.95″W

== Los Angeles County ==
Ship	Flag	Sunk date	Notes	Coordinates
Ada Hancock	United States	April 27, 1863	A steam-powered tender suffered a boiler explosion in Los Angeles Harbor killing 26 of her 53 passengers. A common urban legend states that onboard was $125,000 in gold, transported by a Wells Fargo messenger, which was never recovered.	
Ace I		April 29, 1948	A barge that foundered in a storm and was scuttled as a hazard to navigation off San Pedro, Los Angeles.	
Avalon	United States	September 16, 1964	A passenger ship that foundered under tow off Palos Verdes.	33.726°N 118.354°W
USS Burrfish	United States Navy	November 19, 1969	A Balao-class submarine that was sunk as a target off San Clemente Island.	
Charles F. Crocker		1929	A barquentine that was run aground and dismasted for a movie off Santa Catalina Island, sometime around 1929. The wreck was later burned, and then moved further inland by a tidal bore.	
Dauntless		October 3, 1928	A schooner that was blown up for the movie The Rescue off Catalina Harbor, Santa Catalina Island.	
Diosa del Mar	United States	July 30, 1990	A wooden schooner that ran aground on Ship Rock at Santa Catalina Island.	33.462770°N 118.491925°W
Dominator	United States	March 13, 1961	A cargo ship that ran aground on Rocky Point, Palos Verdes.	33°46′26″N 118°25′42″W
F.S. Loop		1947	A barge that sank near Angel's Gate and was blown up as a hazard to navigation.	
Georgia		February 22, 1966	A barge that was scuttled off Redondo Beach.	
Georgia Straits			A tug that sank under tow off Los Angeles.	
USS Gregory	United States Navy	March 4, 1971	A Fletcher-class destroyer that was bombed as a target off San Clemente Island.	
Johanna Smith	United States	July 22, 1932	A schooner that caught fire and sank off Long Beach.	
USS John C. Butler	United States Navy	1971	A John C. Butler-class destroyer escort that was sunk as a target off San Clemente.	
USS Koka	United States Navy	December 7, 1937	A Bagaduce-class fleet tug that ran aground off San Clemente Island.	
Margaret C.			A schooner that was blown up for a movie in Catalina Harbor, Santa Catalina Island, in about 1926.	
Monfalcone		August 31, 1930	A gambling ship that caught fire and sank off Long Beach.	
USS Moody	United States Navy	February 21, 1933	A Clemson-class destroyer that was blown up in San Pedro Bay for the MGM movie Hell Below.	
USS Moray	United States Navy	June 18, 1970	A Balao-class submarine that was sunk as a target off San Clemente.	33.425°N 117.629°W
USS Naifeh	United States Navy	July 11, 1966	A John C. Butler-class destroyer escort that was sunk as a target off San Clemente Island.	
Ningpo		1938	A Chinese junk that was beached then burned at Santa Catalina Island.	
Olympic II		September 4, 1940	A barge that collided with the Japanese freighter Sakito Maru off San Pedro. The wreck was blown up as a hazard to navigation.	
Palmyra			A schooner that was beached and burned off Santa Catalina Island, around 1938.	
Princess Louise		June 20, 1990	A cruise ship, later converted into a floating restaurant, that sank under tow about 16 nautical miles (30 km) southwest of Point Fermin, while en route to Catalina to be sunk as an artificial reef.	
Sacramento		December 2, 1968	A barge and ferry that foundered off Redondo Beach.	
Sansinena	Liberia	December 17, 1976	An oil tanker that exploded at the Port of Los Angeles.	33°42′52″N 118°16′29″W
S.N. Castle		February 17, 1926	A barquentine that was burned and sunk in Catalina Harbor at Santa Catalina Island, for the movie Old Ironsides.	
SueJac		November 14, 1980	A schooner that ran aground on Casino Point, Santa Catalina Island.	
USS Stribling	United States Navy	January 1937	A Wickes-class destroyer that was sunk as a target off San Pedro.	
UB-88	United States Navy	January 3, 1921	A Wickes-class destroyer that was sunk as a target off San Pedro.	
USS Vammen	United States Navy	February 18, 1971	Sunk by a Condor missile strike off San Clemente Island.	Lat 118–33.0 N, Long 32–54.05 W

== Marin County ==
Ship	Flag	Sunk date	Notes	Coordinates
Labouchere	United Kingdom	April 14, 1866	A paddle steamer that ran aground off Point Reyes.	38°05′N 123°01′W
San Agustin	Spain	November 1595	A Manila galleon under the command of Sebastião Rodrigues Soromenho that was wrecked at anchor in Drakes Bay, the first shipwreck in California.	37.99677°N 123.01984°W
Tennessee		March 6, 1853	A passenger steamship that ran aground off Indian Cove, now renamed Tennessee Cove.	

== Mendocino County ==
Ship	Flag	Sunk date	Notes	Coordinates
Il’mena	Russia	June 19, 1820	A Russian-American Company maritime fur trade brig that wrecked at Point Arena. All people and cargo was saved and taken to Bodega Bay and Fort Ross.	
Frolic		1850	An opium-trading brig wrecked near Point Cabrillo Light in 1850. Frolic was the subject of a 2003 episode of Deep Sea Detectives.	
Josephine Woolcot		1886	A schooner wrecked by a storm off Mendocino City. Ship broke in half mid ship into two sections – bow and two mast / transon and two mast, sank with fantail pointing northwest in large surf.	
Sea Foam		January 28, 1931	A schooner that was wrecked at Point Arena.	

== Orange County ==
Ship	Flag	Sunk date	Notes	Coordinates
Charles Brown		April 21, 1932	A barge that ran aground off Laguna Beach.	
Elsie I		October 17, 1951	A barge that capsized in a storm off Huntington Beach.	
Foss 125		November 17, 1958	A barge that foundered in a storm off Laguna Beach.	

== San Diego County ==
Ship	Flag	Sunk date	Notes	Coordinates
USS Abercrombie	United States Navy	January 7, 1968	A John C. Butler-class destroyer escort that was sunk as a target off San Diego.	
USS Archer-Fish	United States Navy	October 19, 1968	A Balao-class submarine that was sunk as a target off San Diego.	
USS Aspro	United States Navy	November 16, 1962	A Balao-class submarine that was sunk as a target off San Diego.	
USS Atlanta	United States Navy	October 1, 1970	A Cleveland-class light cruiser that was sunk as a target.	32.8796°N 118.5081°W
USS Blackfin	United States Navy	May 13, 1973	A Balao-class submarine that was sunk as a target off San Diego.	
USS Champlin	United States Navy	April 12, 1936	A Wickes-class destroyer that was sunk as a target off San Diego.	
USS F-1	United States Navy	December 17, 1917	An F-class submarine that was sunk in a collision off Point Loma.	
USS Hogan	United States Navy	November 8, 1945	A Wickes-class destroyer that was bombed as a target off San Diego.	
USS Knight	United States Navy	October 27, 1967	A Gleaves-class destroyer that was sunk as a target off San Diego.	
USS Marcus	United States Navy	June 25, 1935	A Clemson-class destroyer that was sunk as a target off San Diego.	
Monte Carlo	United States	January 1, 1937	An oil tanker that drifted onto Coronado in a storm.	32.674°N 117.173°W
USS PC-815	United States Navy	September 11, 1945	A PC-461-class submarine chaser that was sunk in a collision with USS Laffey off San Diego.	32°37′54″N 117°14′12″W
USS S-37	United States Navy	February 20, 1945	An S-class submarine that broke tow and sank off Imperial Beach.	
USS Sabalo	United States Navy	February 15, 1973	A Balao-class submarine that was sunk as a target off San Diego.	32.7052°N 117.4424°W
USS Sloat	United States Navy	June 26, 1935	A Clemson-class destroyer that was sunk as a target off San Diego.	
Valiant		December 13, 1930	A yacht that caught fire and sank off Descanso Beach.	
USS Williams	United States Navy	June 29, 1968	A John C. Butler-class destroyer escort that sunk as a target off San Diego.	
HMCS Yukon	Maritime Command	July 2000	A Mackenzie-class destroyer that was scuttled off Mission Bay as an artificial reef.	32.77154°N 117.27098°W

== San Francisco County ==
Ship	Flag	Sunk date	Notes	Coordinates
USS Benevolence	United States Navy	April 25, 1950	A hospital ship that sunk in a collision with Mary Luckenbach.	
USS Boston	United States Navy	April 8, 1946	A protected cruiser that was scuttled off San Francisco.	37.741°N 122.583°W
USS Bunting	United States Navy	June 3, 1942	A minesweeper that sank in a collision.	
City of Chester	United States	August 22, 1888	A passenger ship that collided with RMS Oceanic in San Francisco Bay.	37°48′50″N 122°28′00″W
City of Rio de Janeiro	United States	February 21, 1901	A steamship that struck a reef in San Francisco Bay.	
USS Conestoga	United States Navy	1921	An ocean-going tug that was declared "lost at sea" on June 30, 1921. The wreck was discovered in the Greater Farallones National Marine Sanctuary in 2009, and formally identified as Conestoga in 2016.	
USS Devilfish	United States Navy	August 14, 1968	A Balao-class submarine that was sunk as a target off San Francisco.	37°5′N 124°8′W
Escambia	United Kingdom	June 19, 1882	A steamboat that capsized off San Francisco.	
May Flint	United States	8 September 1900	A barque that struck USS Iowa and sank in San Francisco Bay.	
USS Hornbill	United States Navy	June 30, 1942	A coastal minesweeper that collided with Esther Johnson in San Francisco Bay.	
James Rolph	United States	August 2, 1910	A schooner that ran aground on rocks in San Pablo Bay.	37.5834°N 122.5176°W
King Philip	United States	1878	A clipper that ran aground in heavy surf at Ocean Beach	37°45′5.48″N 122°30′35.29″W
USS Lewis	United States Navy	April 21, 1966	A John C. Butler-class destroyer escort that was sunk as a target.	
Lydia		1907	A wrecked whaling ship located beneath King Street, San Francisco, that was discovered in 1980 during a sewer construction project.	37°46′51″N 122°23′18″W
Ohioan	United States	October 8, 1936	A cargo ship that ran aground near Seal Rock.	37°46′43″N 122°30′58″W
USS Pensacola	United States Navy	May 1912	A steamboat that was burned and sunk by the Navy in San Francisco Bay near Hunter's Point.	
San Rafael	United States	November 30, 1901	A steamboat that collided with Sausalito off Alcatraz Island.	
USS Stewart	United States Navy	May 24, 1946	A Clemson-class destroyer that was sunk as a target west of the Golden Gate.	37.749°N 122.729°W
USS Tingey	United States Navy	May 1966	A Fletcher-class destroyer that was sunk as a target off San Francisco.	
Zenobia	United States	April 20, 1858	A full-rigged ship that struck a rock off Point Bonita.	

== San Luis Obispo County ==
Ship	Flag	Sunk date	Notes	Coordinates
Montebello	United States	December 23, 1941	An oil tanker that was torpedoed by I-21 off Cayucos.	35°35′N 121°16′W

== San Mateo County ==
Ship	Flag	Sunk date	Notes	Coordinates
Carrier Pigeon	United States	June 6, 1853	A clipper that ran aground near Pigeon Point. "On the night of June 6, 1853, the clipper ship Carrier Pigeon ran aground 500 feet off shore of the central California coast. The area is now called Pigeon Point in her honor. The Carrier Pigeon was a state-of-the art, 19th Century clipper ship. She was 175 feet long with a narrow, 34 foot beam and rated at about 845 tons burden. Launched in the fall of 1852 from Bath, Maine, the Carrier Pigeon ... started out on her maiden voyage on January 28, 1853. Out of Boston and bound for San Francisco, the Carrier Pigeon was under the command of Captain Azariah Doane." (Pigeon Point History). There were no deaths in the sinking.	
Sir John Franklin		January 17, 1865	Clipper ship. The ship was headed for San Francisco and in heavy fog struck rocks off of the point, since then renamed Franklin Point. The ship was destroyed, killing the Captain and eleven men. The point is located in Ano Nuevo State Reserve. The seamen were buried there; the officers in San Francisco.	
Point Arena		1913	A steam schooner. Pieces of the hull are on display at Pigeon Point Lighthouse.	
San Juan		August 29, 1929	A passenger steamer that was rammed by S. C. T. Dodd off Pigeon Point.	37°11′N 122°25′W
USS Thompson	United States Navy	February 1944	A Clemson-class destroyer that was sunk as a target in San Francisco Bay.	37.5529°N 122.1576°W

== Santa Barbara County ==
Ship	Flag	Sunk date	Notes	Coordinates
Aggie		May 4, 1915	A barquentine that ran aground at Santa Rosa Island.	
USS Chauncey	United States Navy	September 8, 1923	One of seven United States Navy ships that ran aground off Lompoc in an incident known as the Honda Point Disaster.	34.602067°N 120.644109°W
Chickasaw	United States	February 7, 1962	A cargo ship that ran aground on Santa Rosa Island.	
Crown of England		November 7, 1894	A steamship that ran aground off Santa Rosa Island.	
Cuba	United States	September 7, 1923	A German steamboat that was seized by the United States in 1917, and eventually ran aground off San Miguel Island, on the same day as the Honda Point Disaster.	
USS Delphy	United States Navy	September 8, 1923	One of seven United States Navy ships that ran aground off Lompoc in an incident known as the Honda Point Disaster.	34.602067°N 120.644109°W
USS Fuller	United States Navy	September 8, 1923	One of seven United States Navy ships that ran aground off Lompoc in an incident known as the Honda Point Disaster.	34.602067°N 120.644109°W
Goldenhorn		September 12, 1892	A barque that ran aground off Santa Rosa Island.	
Humble SM-1		November 25, 1961	A drillship that foundered off Santa Barbara.	
USS McCulloch	United States Navy	June 13, 1917	A cutter that collided with Governor off Point Conception.	
USS Nicholas	United States Navy	September 8, 1923	One of seven United States Navy ships that ran aground off Lompoc in an incident known as the Honda Point Disaster.	34.602067°N 120.644109°W
Santa Rosa	United States	July 8, 1911	A steamship that ran aground at Point Arguello.	
Sibyl Marston		January 12, 1909	A schooner that ran aground off Lompoc.	34.653474°N 120.61747°W
USS S. P. Lee	United States Navy	September 8, 1923	One of seven United States Navy ships that ran aground off Lompoc in an incident known as the Honda Point Disaster.	34.602067°N 120.644109°W
Tokujomaru		March 1815	Japanese vessel under Oguri Jukichi damaged off Japan and drifted across the Pacific. Survivors rescued by Forester near Point Conception.	
USS Woodbury	United States Navy	September 8, 1923	One of seven United States Navy ships that ran aground off Lompoc in an incident known as the Honda Point Disaster.	34.602067°N 120.644109°W
Yankee Blade	United States	October 1, 1854	A steamboat that ran aground at Point Arguello.	34°34′37″N 120°38′50″W
USS Young	United States Navy	September 8, 1923	One of seven United States Navy ships that ran aground off Lompoc in an incident known as the Honda Point Disaster.	34.602067°N 120.644109°W

== Santa Cruz County ==
Ship	Flag	Sunk date	Notes	Coordinates
Palo Alto	United States	1929	A concrete ship sunk in shallow water at Seacliff State Beach as an entertainment venue, and now serves as an artificial reef.	36.969592°N 121.913416°W

== Sonoma County ==
Ship	Flag	Sunk date	Notes	Coordinates
Pomona	United States	March 17, 1908	A steamship that ran aground near Fort Ross Cove, Fort Ross.	38.510278°N 123.245556°W

== Ventura County ==
Ship	Flag	Sunk date	Notes	Coordinates
USS Agerholm	United States Navy	July 18, 1982	A Gearing-class destroyer that was sunk as a target off San Nicolas Island.	32°45′N 119°32′W
USS Deperm	United States Navy	September 22, 1982	A degaussing vessel, sunk as a target.	32°58′N 119°41′W
Equator		July 2, 1949	A fishing vessel that ran aground off Anacapa Island.	
La Jenelle	United States	April 13, 1970	A cruise ship that was grounded off Port Hueneme, California.	
USS Makassar Strait	United States Navy	April 1961	A Casablanca-class escort carrier that ran aground on San Nicolas Island.	
USS Ulvert M. Moore	United States Navy	July 13, 1966	A John C. Butler-class destroyer escort that was sunk as a target off San Nicolas Island.	
Winfield Scott	United States	December 2, 1853	A paddle steamer that ran aground on Anacapa Island.	
