= Ivan Kuskov =

Administrator of Fort Ross

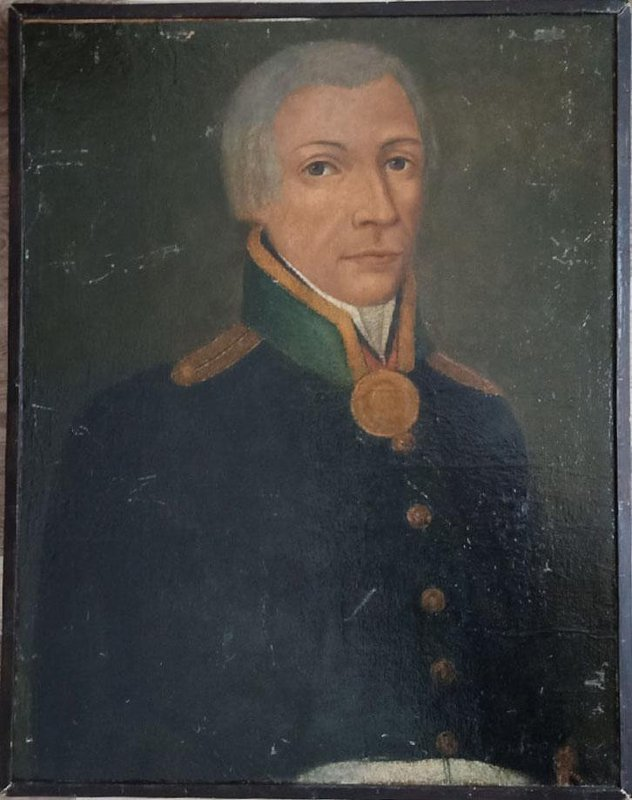
- A portrait of Ivan Kuskov from the Totma Regional Museum

Personal details
- Born: Ivan Aleksandrovich Kuskov; 1765 Totma, Russia
- Died: 1823 (aged 57–58) Totma, Russia

Ivan Aleksandrovich Kuskov (Russian: Иван Александрович Кусков; 1765–1823) was the senior assistant to Aleksandr Baranov, the Chief Administrator of the Russian-American Company (RAC).

== Biography ==
He was a native of Totma, Russia, he served in the RAC for 31 years, attaining the rank of Commerce Counselor (12th rank) and being awarded the gold medal "for zealous service" from Emperor Aleksandr I. Between 1808 and 1812 he led five exploratory expeditions to California with the intent of founding an agricultural settlement to supply the northern colonies of Russian America (Alaska).

Kuskov, under guidance from Baranov, founded Fortress Ross (present day Fort Ross) in 1812.

Kuskov served as Administrator at Fort Ross from 1812 until 1821. In 1819 he was recommended for the Order of St. Vladimir, 4th class, but had not received the award by the time of his death in 1823. After retiring from the RAC he returned to his home town of Totma, in the Vologda province on July 4, 1821, and died in 1823. His house is preserved to this day in Totma as the "Kuskov House Museum", under the direction of the Totma Museum Association, which preserves two original portraits, presumed to have been painted in California of Kuskov and his wife.

== See also ==
- Timofei Nikitich Tarakanov

== Bibliography ==
- Scott Foresman, History-Social Science for California, Unit 3, Lesson 1, Pearson Education, Inc., Glenview Illinois, 2006.
