= Island of the Blue Dolphins =

1960 children's book by Scott O'Dell

- First edition
- Author: Scott O'Dell
- Cover artist: Evaline Ness
- Language: English
- Genre: Children's fiction
- Publisher: Houghton Mifflin Harcourt
- Publication date: 1960
- Publication place: United States
- Media type: Print (hardcover and paperback); audiobook
- Pages: 177
- ISBN: 0-395-06962-9
- OCLC: 225474
- Followed by: Zia

Island of the Blue Dolphins is a 1960 children's novel by American author Scott O'Dell, which tells the story of a girl named Karana who is stranded alone for years on an island off the California coast. It is based on the true story of Juana Maria, a Nicoleño Native American left alone for 18 years on San Nicolas Island during the nineteenth century.

Island of the Blue Dolphins won the Newbery Medal in 1961. It was adapted into a film of the same name three years later. O'Dell later wrote a sequel, Zia, published in 1976. Island of the Blue Dolphins has been the subject of much literary and pedagogical scholarship related to survival, feminism, the resilience of Indigenous peoples, and beyond. In 2026, Island of the Blue Dolphins was presented with the "Il Miglior Libro Mai Premiato" (Best Book Ever Awarded) Premio Andersen (Andersen Prize).

== Historical basis ==
The book is based on the true story of "The Lone Woman of San Nicolas Island", a Nicoleño Native Californian who lived alone for 18 years on San Nicolas Island, one of the Channel Islands off the California coast.

Around 1835, the Nicoleño people were taken aboard a ship headed for California, with the intention that missionaries would convert them upon arrival on the mainland. Once aboard the ship, it was realized that Juana Maria was not among them. By that time, a strong storm arose, and the crew of "Peor es Nada", realizing the imminent danger of being wrecked by the surf and rocks, panicked and sailed toward the mainland, leaving her behind.

A more romantic version tells of Juana Maria diving overboard after realizing her younger brother had been left behind, although archaeologist Steven J. Schwartz notes, "The story of her jumping overboard does not show up until the 1880s ... By then the Victorian era is well underway, and literature takes on a flowery, even romantic flavor." Due to inclement sea-faring weather, the ship could not return and she lived on the island for nearly two decades before being discovered and taken to the mainland in 1853 by sea otter hunter Captain George Nidever and his crew. According to Nidever, the Lone Woman lived in a structure supported by whale ribs and stashed useful objects around the island. She was baptized and given the Christian name Juana Maria, assigned to her by the Santa Barbara Mission where she eventually was brought. Although some sources claimed that no one alive at that time spoke her language, forcing her to rely on using a form of sign language to communicate, recent sources claimed that there were some Indigenous Californians who were able to communicate with Juana Maria with varying degrees of fluency. Norberto, a Fernandeño man, was noted in recently unearthed field notes to be able to communicate with her fully. Just as the other Nicoleño Natives, who had previously been brought to the mainland, the Lone Woman died of dysentery after seven weeks.

In 2009, the University of Oregon archaeologist Jon Erlandson found two old redwood boxes eroding from an island sea cliff, with whalebone placed on top of them. With colleagues René Vellanoweth, Lisa Barnett-Thomas, and Troy Davis, Erlandson salvaged the boxes and other artifacts before they were destroyed by erosion. Vellanoweth and Barnett-Thomas examined the contents in a San Nicolas Island laboratory, documenting nearly 200 artifacts of Nicoleño, Euro-American, and Native Alaskan manufacture. The boxes appear to have been cached intentionally sometime between 1725 and 1743. It was also believed the Lone Woman lived in a cave on the island.

In 2012, archaeologist Steve Schwartz believed he discovered the location of that cave based upon a century old map and began an investigation, working with archaeologist René Vellanoweth and his students from California State University, Los Angeles. The team’s work resulted in the opening of the cave being excavated, but local Native American tribes requested the dig be stopped and the Navy complied. Commanders at the Navy base on the island ordered Schwartz to halt the dig in 2015. The following year, Professor Patricia Martz started an online petition to stop the Navy’s plans to move artifacts from San Nicolas Island to a facility in China Lake. Despite gaining over 390 signatures, representatives from the Navy responded to the petition and formally expressed the safety and regulatory requirements met by China Lake. As such, the articles from San Nicolas were moved.

== Plot summary ==
The main character is a Nicoleño girl named Karana. She has a brother named Ramo and an older sister named Ulape. Her people live in a village called Ghalas-at and the tribe survives by gathering roots and fishing and hunting.

One day, a ship of Russian fur hunters and their Creole and Aleut workers led by Captain Orlov arrive and persuade the Nicoleños to let them hunt sea otter in exchange for other goods. However, the Russians attempt to swindle the islanders by leaving without paying. When they are confronted by Karana's father, Chief Chowig, a battle breaks out. Karana's father and many other men in the tribe die in battle against the well-armed Russians.

Later, the "replacement" Chief Kimki leaves the island on a canoe for new land in the East. Eventually, he sends a "giant canoe" to bring his people to the mainland even though Kimki himself does not return. The white missionaries come to Karana's village and tell them to pack their goods and go to the ship. Karana's brother, Ramo, runs off to retrieve his fishing spear. Although Karana urges the captain to wait for Ramo to return, the ship must leave before a storm approaches. Despite restraint, Karana jumps off the ship and swims to shore, and the ship departs without them.

While awaiting the return of the ship, Ramo is brutally killed by a pack of feral dogs. Alone on the island, Karana takes on everyone's tasks, such as hunting, making spears, and building canoes to survive. She vows to avenge Ramo's death and kills several dogs, but has a change of heart after wounding the leader of the pack. Karana tames him and names him Rontu.

Over time, Karana makes a life for herself, even successfully hunting a giant devilfish (a massive creature like an octopus or squid) with Rontu. She builds a home made of whale bones and stocks a cave with provisions in case the Aleuts come back, so she can hide from them. Karana also tames some birds and an otter, named Mon-a-nee, while feeling a close kinship to the animals (the only inhabitants of the island beside herself).

The Aleuts return one summer, and Karana takes refuge in the cave. She observes the Aleuts closely and realizes that a girl named Tutok takes care of the domestic duties including getting water from the pool near Karana's cave. Fearful of being discovered, Karana goes out only at night, yet the curious girl stalks Karana, and the two meet. Karana and Tutok exchange gifts and Karana realizes how lonely she has been. The next day, Karana sees the ship with Tutok departing before Karana returns to her house and starts rebuilding.

More time passes, and Rontu dies. Karana soon finds a young dog that looks like Rontu and takes him in, naming him Rontu-Aru. One day, Karana sees the sails of a ship, but it moors offshore and leaves. Two years later in the spring, the boat returns. Karana dresses in her finest attire, a dress of cormorant feathers, and waits on the shore for the boat. Her rescuers make a dress for her, as they believe Karana's dress of cormorant feathers is not appropriate for the mainland. She does not like the dress, but realizes that it is part of her new life. The ship takes Karana, Rontu-Aru, and her two birds to the mission in Santa Barbara, California. There, Father Gonzales tells her that the ship that had taken her tribe away had sunk before it could return to the Island of the Blue Dolphins for her.

== Publication ==
=== First edition ===
After witnessing animal cruelty near his home, O’Dell first wrote Island of the Blue Dolphins in 1960, to promote a respect for all forms of life. Its first submission was turned down, as the publisher believed the story should feature a male protagonist. Yet, O’Dell felt strongly about Karana’s presence and looked to other publishing companies. Although he wrote the novel with the intended audience of adults, O’Dell’s next publisher suggested that it would be better for children, and it was published that same year. Soon after, in 1961, it had tremendous success and was awarded the Newbery Medal.

=== Critical edition ===
The 50th Anniversary edition of Island of the Blue Dolphins includes a new introduction by Newbery Medalist Lois Lowry and also includes extracts from Father Gonzales Rubio in the Santa Barbara Mission's Book of Burials. Island of the Blue Dolphins: The Complete Reader's Edition, a critical edition edited by Sara L. Schwebel, was published in October 2016 by the University of California Press. It includes two chapters deleted from the book before publication.

== Film adaptation ==
A film adaptation of Island of the Blue Dolphins was released on July 3, 1964. It was directed by James B. Clark and starred Celia Kaye as Karana. Jane Klove and Ted Sherdeman adapted the script from O'Dell's novel, and the film was produced by Robert B. Radnitz and Universal Pictures. The film was made on a slight budget but did receive a wide release three months after its New York premiere. Howard Thompson writing for The New York Times characterized it as a children's film. Kaye won a Golden Globe Award for New Star of the Year for her performance. The film earned an estimated $2 million in rentals in North America.

== Reception ==
At the time of the book's publication, The Horn Book Magazine said: "Years of research must have gone into this book to turn historical fact into so moving and lasting an experience." In a retrospective essay about the Newbery Medal-winning books from 1956 to 1965, librarian Carolyn Horovitz wrote: "The girl, Karana, is portrayed in such intimate and close relationship with the natural elements of her background, the earth, the sea, the animals, the fish, that the reader is given both the terror and beauty of life itself. It is a book to make the reader wonder."

== Analysis ==
=== Literary analysis ===
Since the time of its publication, Island of the Blue Dolphins has been the subject of many pieces of literary scholarship. The text explores the themes of independence, vulnerability, growth, survival, paternalism, and rescue, among others. The first-person point of view employed throughout the text is another narrative technique that serves to strengthen Karana's characterization and convey her courage and love.

The book can be considered a "Robinsonade", meaning that it tells the story of a character who must survive on a deserted island (or the equivalent), named after Robinson Crusoe. Diann L. Baecker, a professor of Languages and Literature, suggests that the text is more than merely a "rescue narrative" where an orphan girl needs to be saved by a paternalistic hero. Rather, Baecker argues that readers themselves can interpret Island of the Blue Dolphins to be a feminist parable and story of survival.

Many attribute the long-lasting power of the novel to this existence of a strong female protagonist with unisex characteristics, brought to the public during a time when this was not the norm. Karana takes on roles typically associated with men in order to survive, such as her skillful crafting of weapons. At the same time, Karana remains tied to her feminine association with nature as she lovingly cares for hurt animals and vows never to hunt them again. Literary scholar and professor C. Anita Tarr argues the success of the story should be attributed to Karana's lack of emotions and the major gaps in O'Dell's writing, which allow readers to fill in their own interpretations and feelings.

Additionally, scholars agree that Island of the Blue Dolphins has both challenged and reproduced harmful stereotypes of Native peoples that had been propagated by past publications. Jon C. Stott, a professor of English, states that O'Dell's position as a Non-Native writer helped bring more attention to the culture and stories of Indigenous people. A past chair of the Scott O'Dell Award for Historical Fiction, Hazel Rochman, also notes the challenges associated with writing authentically about another culture, yet suggests that O'Dell's research and empathy present in the text allowed it to become a long-lasting success.

Carole Goldberg, a Professor of Law and scholar of Native American studies, highlights Island of the Blue Dolphins as what is known as a "vanishing Indian story". Such stories perpetuate the idea that all Native tribes were assimilated into white society in the United States, while ignoring all moral and legal issues related to the colonization of Native Americans. Island of the Blue Dolphins plays into this harmful idea as all the members of Karana’s tribe are either brutally killed or taken away by missionaries, thus disappearing from the narrative entirely. Yet, an alternative reading of the text centered around cultural repatriation and land rights can still serve as a metaphor for tribal resilience.

=== Pedagogical analysis ===
Sara L. Schwebel, chair of the Carolina Children’s Literature consortium and English professor, states that Island of the Blue Dolphins should be better integrated into school curriculum alongside relevant contemporary scholarship. Further, she contends that children can grapple with critical issues such as colonialism, disempowerment, and resilience in school settings. Children may also be more capable of dealing with death in books than adults perceive them to be, and exposure to Island of the Blue Dolphins or texts with similar depictions of death can be helpful for children to begin processing the concept of death at an early age.

== See also ==
- Il’mena

Awards
Preceded by Onion John	Newbery Medal recipient 1961	Succeeded by The Bronze Bow
Preceded by The Helen Keller Story	Winner of the William Allen White Children's Book Award; 1963	Succeeded by The Incredible Journey
