= Juana Maria =

Native American, last Nicoleño (died 1853)

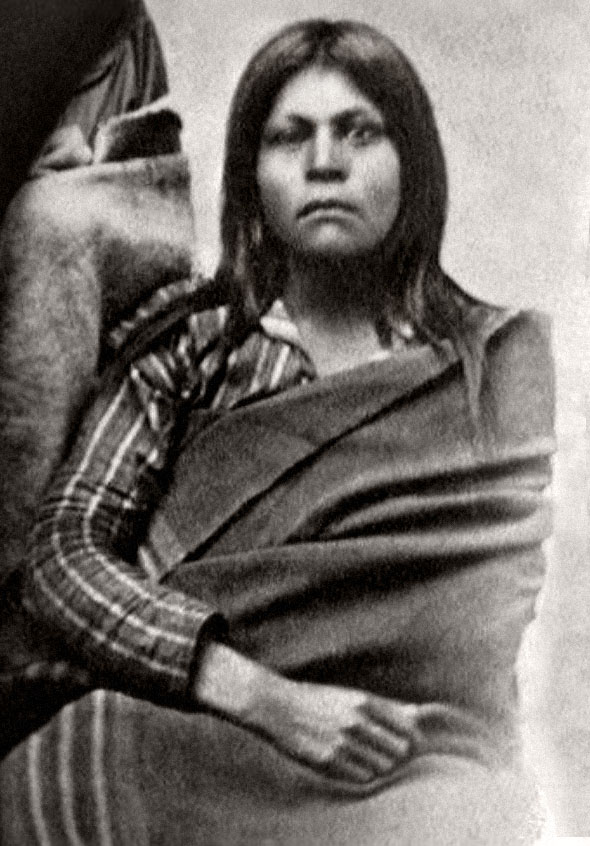
- Photograph of a Native American woman, possibly depicting Maria
- Born: Before 1811; San Nicolas Island, California
- Died: October 19, 1853 (aged 42); Garey, California
- Known for: Being the last Nicoleño; Inspiring the book and short movie Island of the Blue Dolphins

Juana Maria (died October 19, 1853), better known to history as the Lone Woman of San Nicolas Island (her birth name is unknown), was the last surviving member of her tribe, the Nicoleño. She lived alone on San Nicolas Island off the coast of Alta California from 1835 until her removal from the island in 1853. Scott O'Dell's award-winning children's novel Island of the Blue Dolphins (1960) was inspired by her story. She was the last native speaker of the Nicoleño language.

== Background ==
The Channel Islands have long been inhabited by humans, with Indigenous inhabitation first occurring 10,000 years ago or earlier. At the time of European contact, two distinct ethnic groups lived on the archipelago: the Chumash lived on the Northern Channel Islands and the Tongva on the Southern Islands. Juana Maria's tribe, the Nicoleño, were believed to be closely related to the Tongva. In the early 1540s, Spanish (Portuguese by nationality, in the service of Spain) conquistador Juan Rodríguez Cabrillo explored the California coast, claiming it on behalf of Spain.

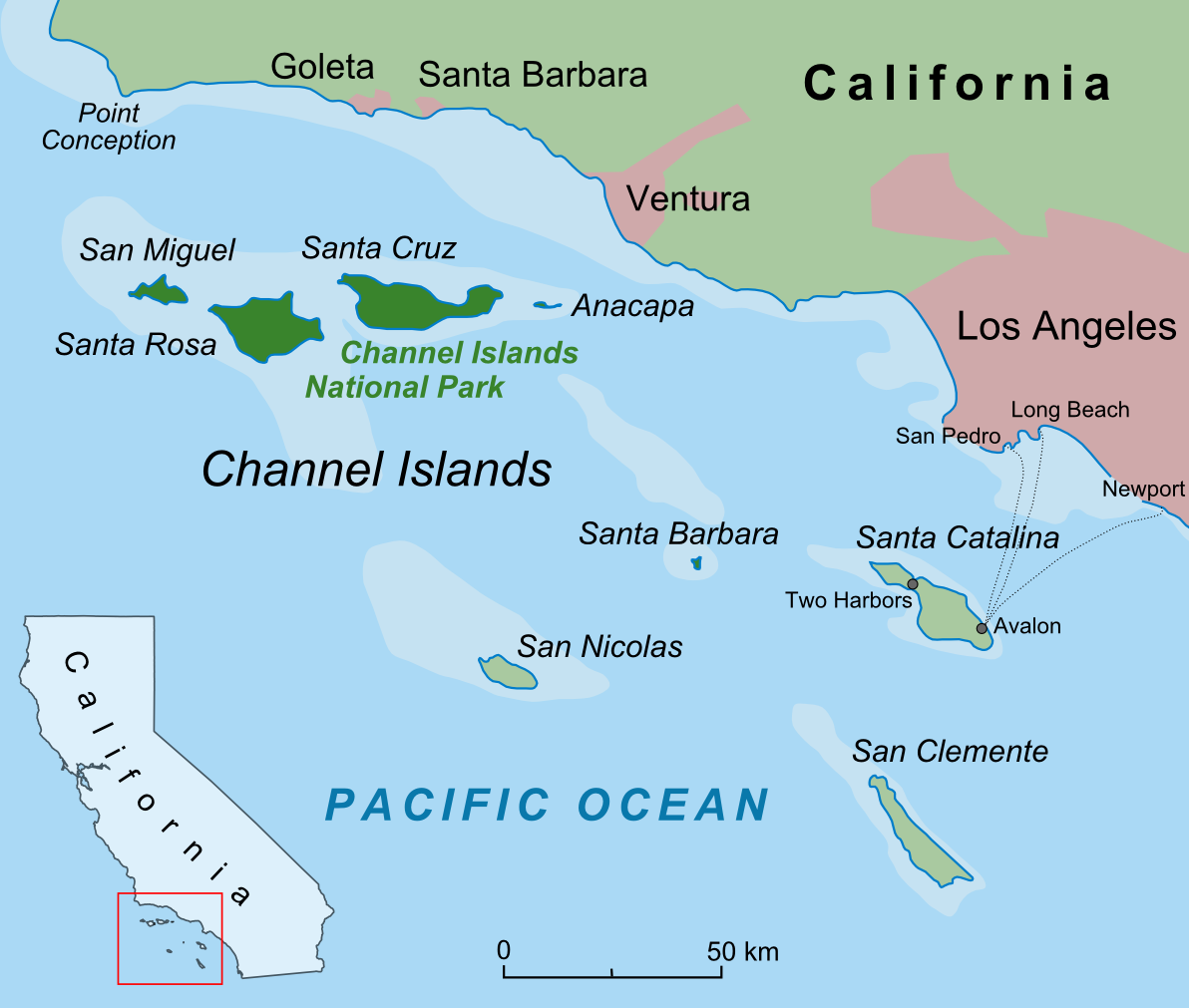
San Nicolas is the most remote of the Southern Channel Islands (shown in light green). Semi-arid and largely barren, it is located 60 miles (97 km) from the mainland coast.

== Arrival of the fur trappers (Aleuts) ==
In 1814, the brig Il’mena brought a party of Native Alaskan otter hunters working for the Russian-American Company (RAC), who massacred most of the islanders after accusing them of killing a Native Alaskan hunter.

Although there was speculation that the Franciscan padres of the California missions requested that the remaining Nicoleños be removed from the island, there is no documentary evidence to back that claim. The missions were undergoing secularization in the 1830s and there was no Franciscan priest at Mission San Gabriel from mid-1835 through spring of 1836 to receive any Nicoleños brought to the mainland.

In late November 1835, the schooner Peor es Nada ("Nothing is Worse"), commanded by Charles Hubbard, left southern California to remove the remaining people living on San Nicolas. Upon arriving at the island, Hubbard's party, which included Isaac Sparks, gathered the islanders on the beach and brought them aboard. Juana Maria, however, was not among them. A strong storm arose, and the crew of Peor es Nada, realizing the imminent danger of being wrecked by the surf and rocks, panicked and sailed toward the mainland, leaving her behind.

A more romantic version tells of Juana Maria diving overboard after realizing her younger brother had been left behind, although archaeologist Steven J. Schwartz notes, "The story of her jumping overboard does not show up until the 1880s ... By then the Victorian era is well underway, and literature takes on a flowery, even romantic flavor." This version is recorded by Juana Maria's eventual rescuer, George Nidever, who heard it from a hunter who had been on the Peor es Nada; however, he makes it clear he may be misremembering what he heard.

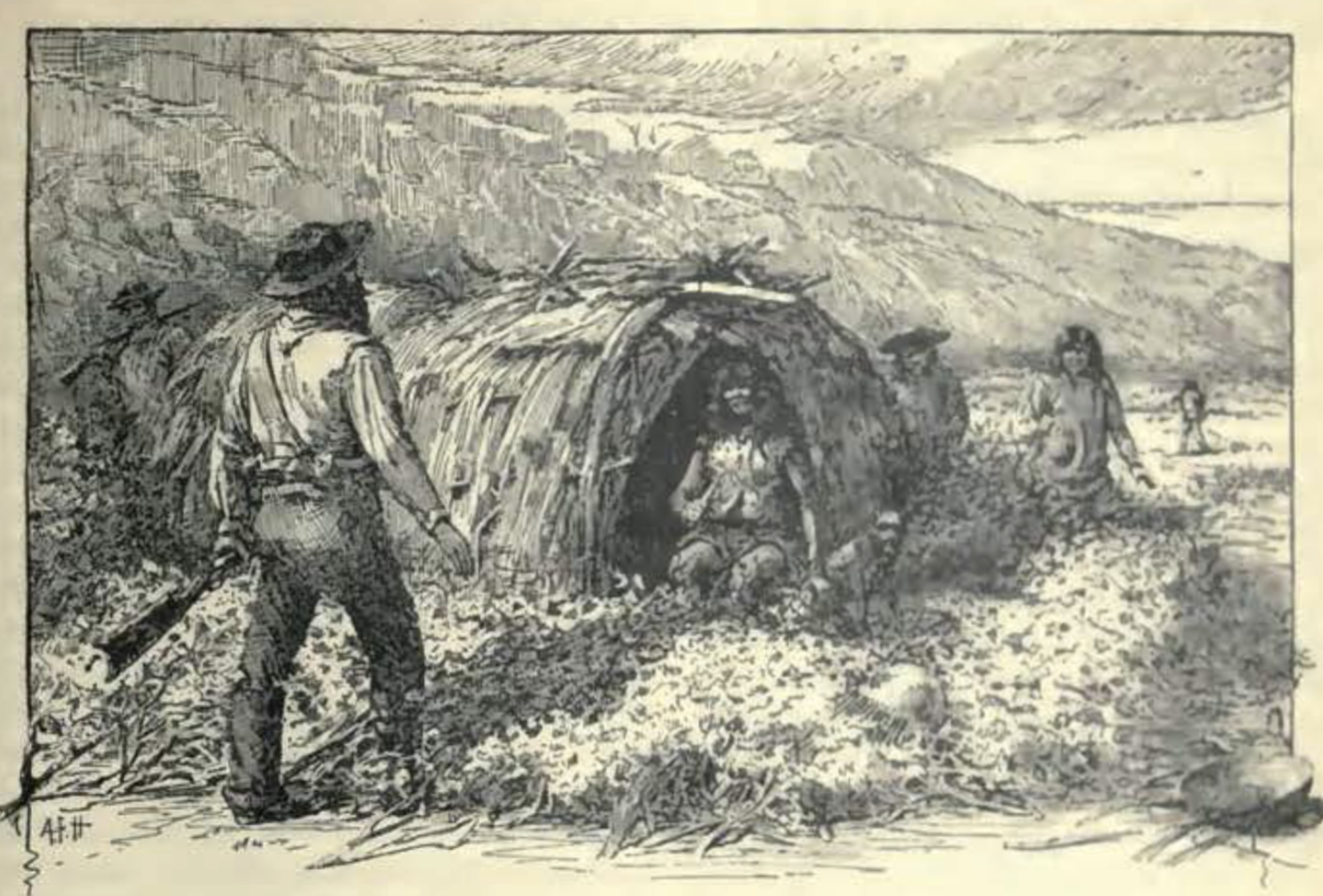
1893 illustration of Juana Maria

== Discovery ==
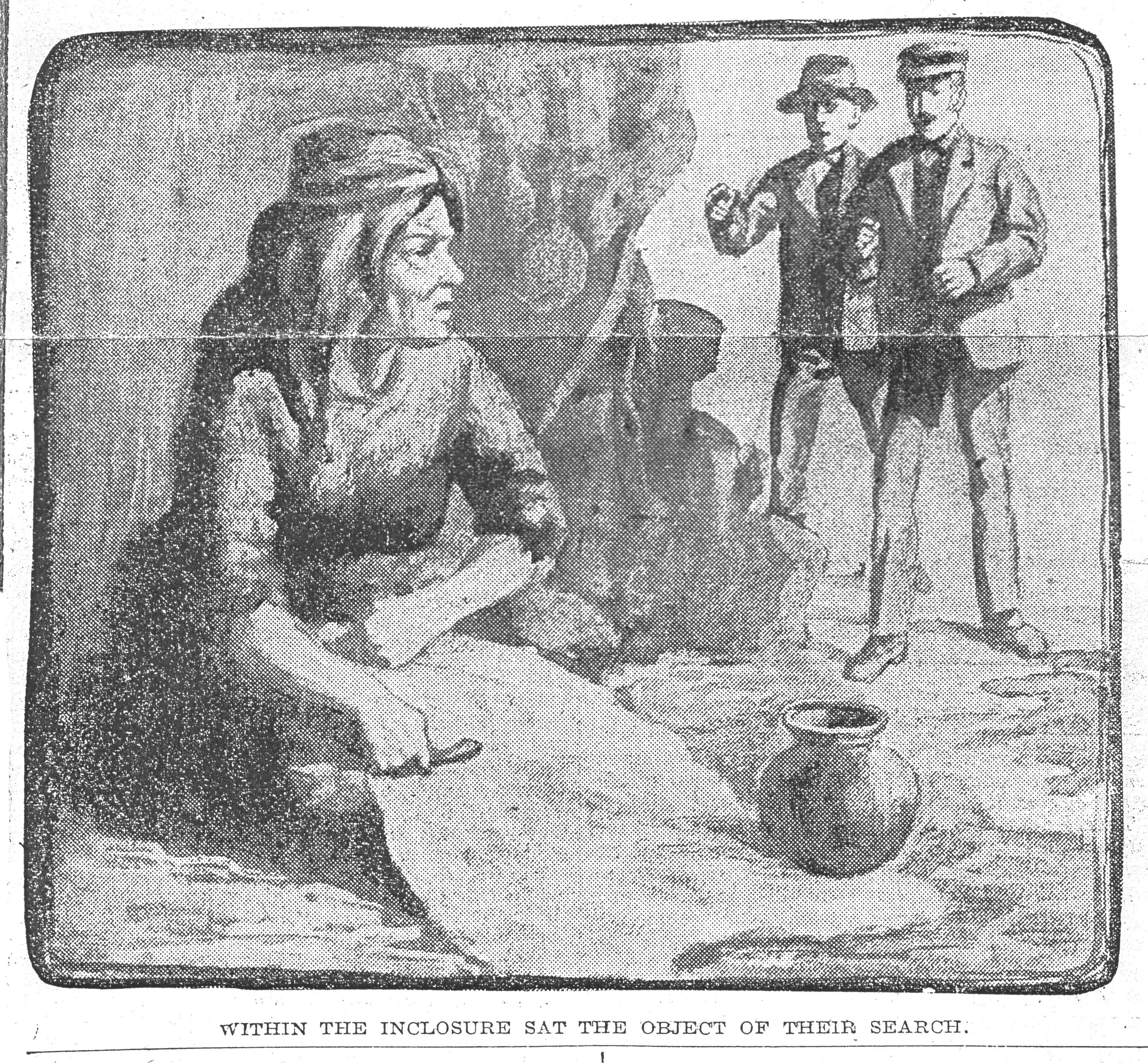
1901 drawing depicting Juana Maria

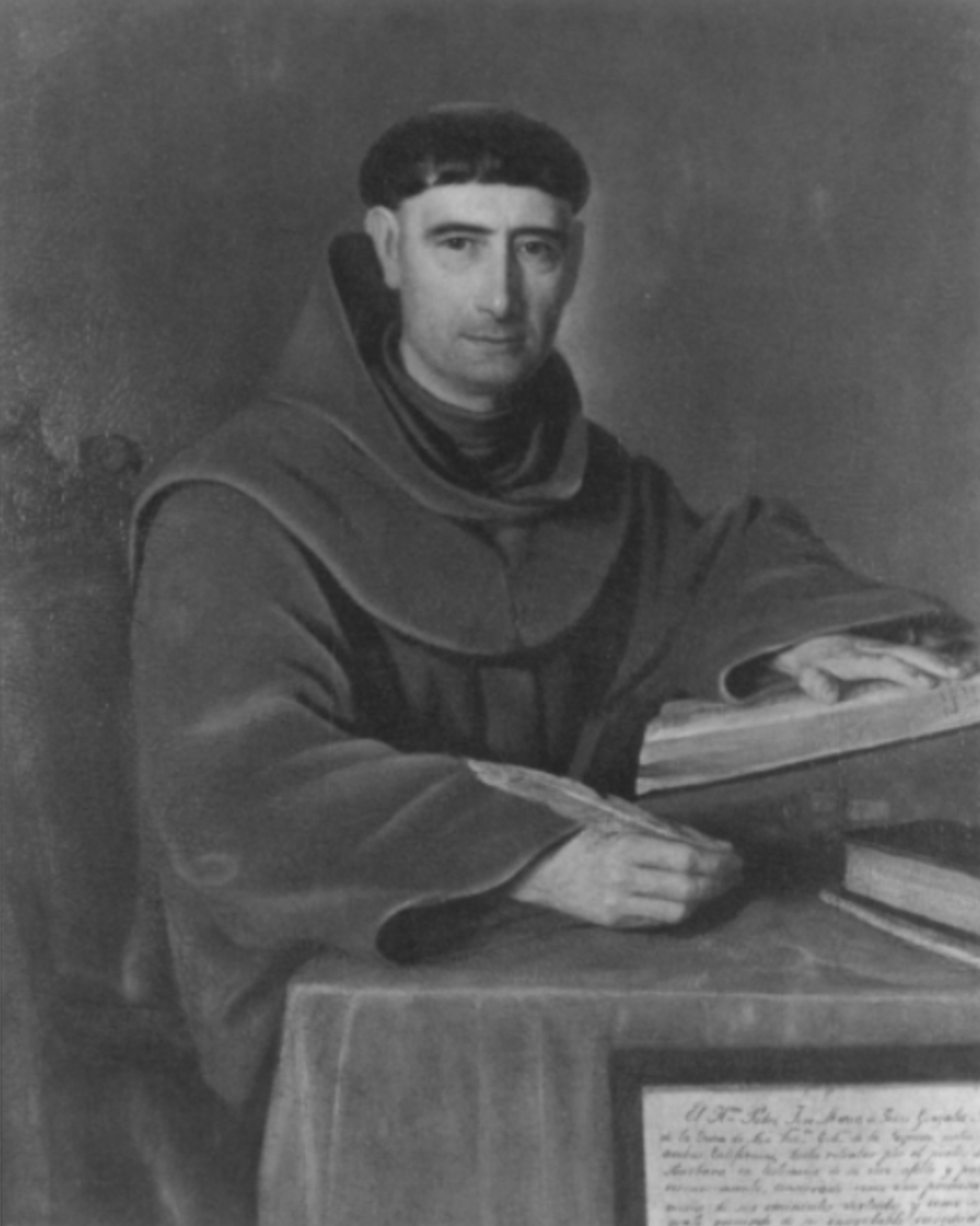
Padre José González Rubio funded an effort to find Juana Maria.

According to Emma Hardacre, there are differing accounts as to the discovery of the Lone Woman. The first is that Father José González Rubio of the Santa Barbara Mission offered a man named Carl Dittman $100 to find her. The second, and what appears to be the original account, from George Nidever, states that Father José González Rubio paid one Thomas Jeffries $200 to find Juana Maria, though he was unsuccessful. The tales Jeffries told upon returning managed to capture the imagination of George Nidever, a Santa Barbara fur trapper, who launched several expeditions of his own. His first two attempts failed to find her, but on his third attempt in the autumn of 1853, one of Nidever's men, Carl Dittman, discovered human footprints on the beach and pieces of seal blubber which had been left out to dry. Further investigation led to the discovery of Juana Maria, who was living on the island in a crude hut partially constructed of whale bones. She was dressed in a skirt made of greenish cormorant feathers. It was believed that she also lived in a nearby cave.

Afterwards, Juana Maria was taken to the Santa Barbara Mission. Some sources claimed that she struggled with communication; for example, one source noted that the local Chumash Indians could not understand her, so the mission sent for a group of Tongva who had formerly lived on Santa Catalina Island, but they were unsuccessful as well. A more recent source, however, found that she was able to successfully communicate with a Fernandeño man named Norberto. Four words and two songs recorded from Juana Maria suggest she spoke one of the Uto-Aztecan languages native to Southern California, but it is not clear to which branch it is related. The only word saved from her vocabulary, according to a letter written by Lennox Tierney from Altadena, California, was "manequana" of which there is no translation. A University of California, Los Angeles study by linguist Pamela Munro focusing on the words and songs suggests that her language was most similar to those of the Luiseños of Northern San Diego County and of the Juaneños near San Juan Capistrano. Both groups traded with the San Nicolas islanders and their languages may have had some influence. This evidence, when taken as a whole, suggests that Juana Maria was a native Nicoleño.

== Life at Santa Barbara Mission ==
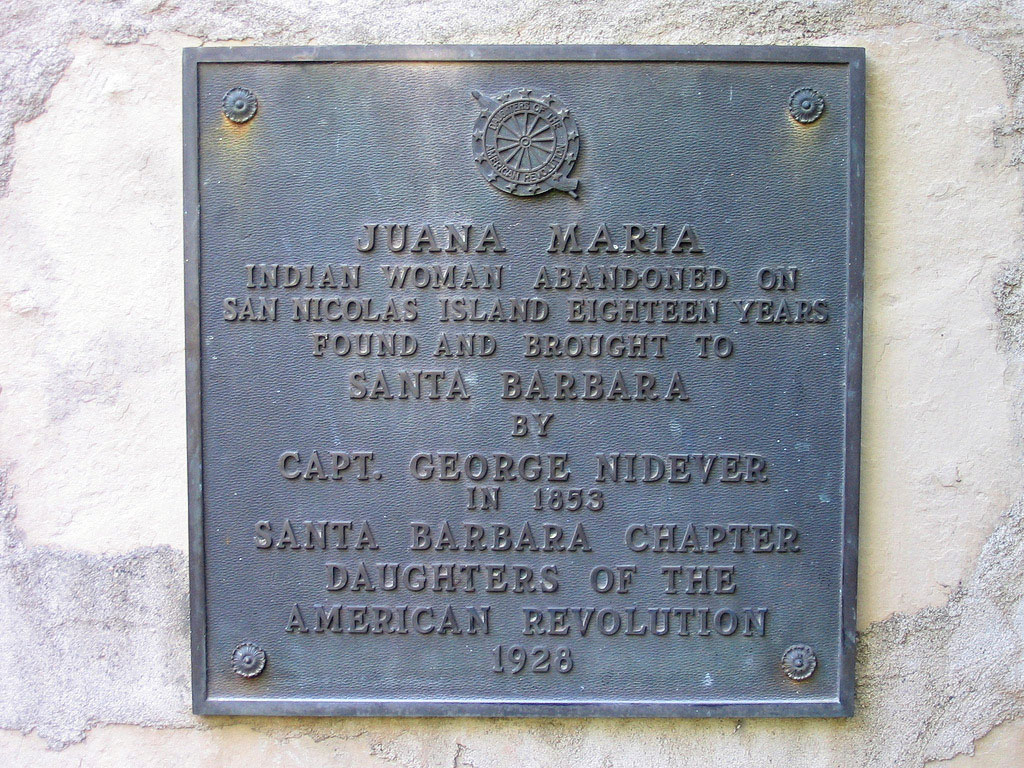
A plaque commemorating Juana Maria at Santa Barbara Mission cemetery, placed there by the Daughters of the American Revolution in 1928.

Juana Maria was reportedly fascinated and ecstatic upon arrival, marveling at the sight of horses, along with European clothing and food. She was allowed to stay with Nidever, who described her as a woman of "medium height, but rather thick ... She was probably about 50 years old, but she was still strong and active. Her face was pleasing as she was continually smiling. Her teeth were entire but worn to the gums."

Juana Maria apparently enjoyed visits by curious Santa Barbara residents, singing and dancing for her audiences. One of the songs Juana Maria sang is popularly called the "Toki Toki" song. Knowledge of this song came from a Ventureño man named Malquiares, an otter hunter who had joined Nidever's expedition to the island and who had heard Juana Maria sing it. Malquiares later recited the words to his friend Fernando Kitsepawit Librado (1839–1915). The song's words are as follows:

Toki Toki yahamimena (×3)
weleshkima nishuyahamimena (×2)
Toki Toki ... (continue as above)

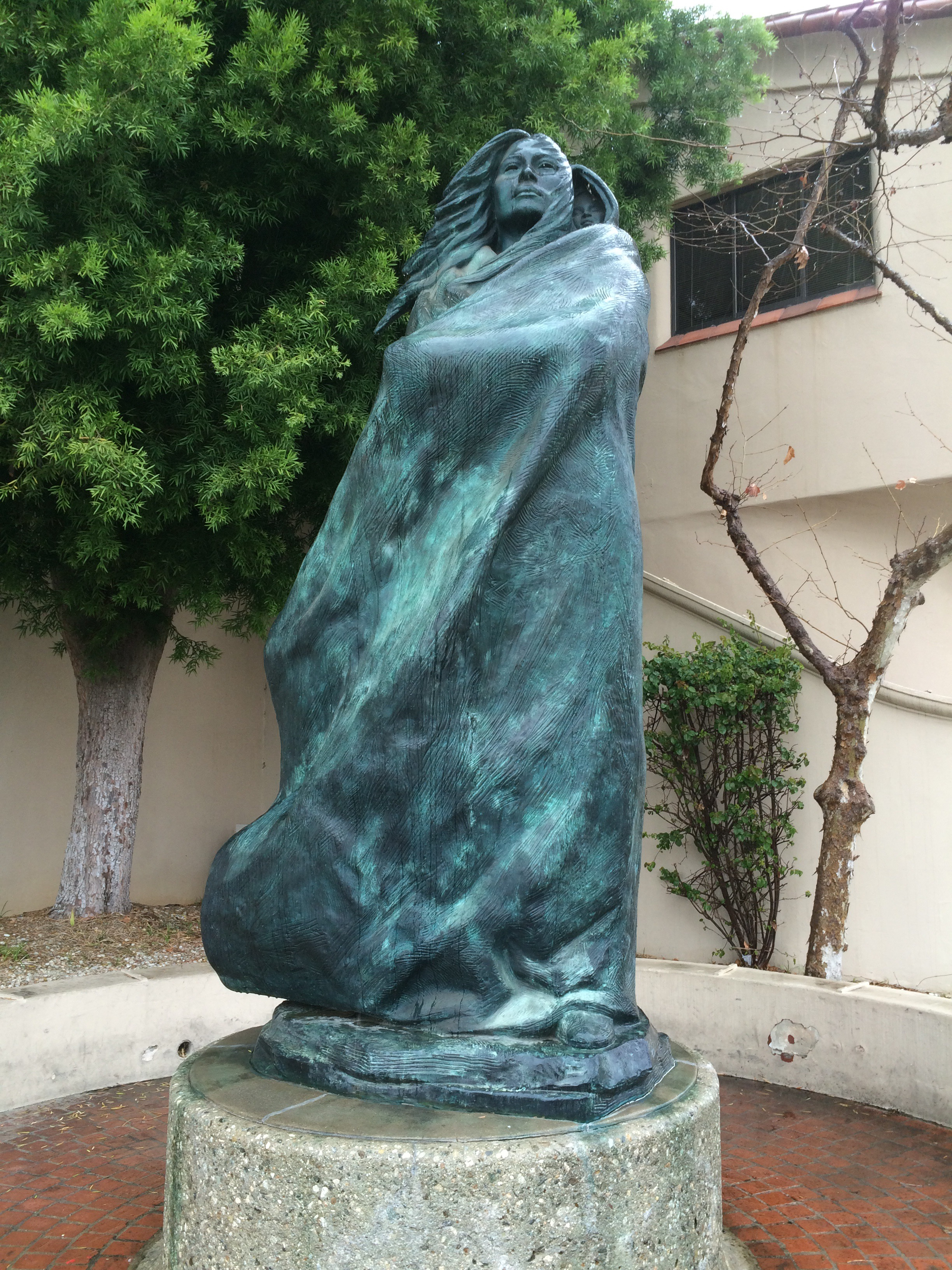
Statue of Juana Maria and child in Santa Barbara, California, at the intersection of State Street & Victoria Street.

Librado recited the words to a Cruzeño indian named Aravio Talawiyashwit, who translated them as "I live contented because I can see the day when I want to get out of this island"; however, given the lack of any other information on Juana Maria's language, this translation's accuracy is dubious, and was perhaps an intuitive guess. Anthropologist and linguist John Peabody Harrington recorded Librado singing the song on a wax cylinder in 1913.

The following text was published by an anonymous writer in Sacramento's Daily Democratic State Journal on October 13, 1853:

The wild woman who was found on the island of San Nicolas about 70 miles from the coast, west of Santa Barbara, is now at the latter place and is looked upon as a curiosity. It is stated she has been some 18 to 20 years alone on the island. She existed on shell fish and the fat of the seal, and dressed in the skins and feathers of wild ducks, which she sewed together with sinews of the seal. She cannot speak any known language, is good-looking and about middle age. She seems to be contented in her new home among the good people of Santa Barbara.

== Death ==
Just seven weeks after arriving on the mainland, Juana Maria died of dysentery in Garey, California. Nidever claimed that her fondness for green corn, vegetables, and fresh fruit, after years of little nutrient-laden food, caused the severe and ultimately fatal illness. Before she died, Father Sanchez baptized and christened her with the Spanish name Juana Maria. She was buried in an unmarked grave on the Nidever family plot at the Santa Barbara Mission cemetery. Father González Rubio made the following entry in the Mission's Book of Burials: "On October 19, 1853 I gave ecclesiastical burial in the cemetery to the remains of Juana Maria, the Indian woman brought from San Nicolas Island and, since there was no one who could understand her language, she was baptized conditionally by Fr. Sanchez." In 1928, a plaque commemorating her was placed at the site by the Daughters of the American Revolution.

Juana Maria's water basket, clothing and various artifacts, including bone needles which had been brought back from the island, were part of the collections of the California Academy of Sciences, but were destroyed in the 1906 San Francisco earthquake and fire. Her cormorant feather dress was apparently sent to the Vatican, but it appears to have been lost, as noted in the Island of the Blue Dolphins.

== Archaeological finds ==
In 1939, archaeologists discovered Juana Maria's whale-bone hut on the northernmost end of San Nicolas, the highest point of the island. The location of the hut exactly matched the descriptions left by Nidever. In 2009, University of Oregon archaeologist Jon Erlandson found two Nicoleño-style redwood boxes eroding from a sea cliff, covered by a whale rib and associated with several asphaltum-coated woven water bottles, and threatened with destruction from winter storms. The site is located on the northwest coast of San Nicolas, where Juana Maria is believed to have spent much of her time. The boxes, salvaged by Erlandson, René Vellanoweth, Lisa Thomas-Barnett, and Troy Davis, contained more than 200 artifacts, including bird-bone pendants, abalone shell dishes and fish hooks, soapstone ornaments, sandstone abraders, red ochre, a Nicoleño harpoon tip, glass projectile points and metal artifacts, and several Native Alaskan toggling harpoon tips. In 2012, Navy archaeologist Steven Schwartz, working with Vellanoweth and his students from California State University, Los Angeles, found and uncovered the buried remnants of the long-lost Indian Cave, where Juana Maria may also have lived. Archaeological research at the cave has been halted at the request of the Pechanga Band of Luiseno Indians, which claims cultural affiliation with the island's ancient residents.

== Legacy ==
Scott O'Dell's Island of the Blue Dolphins was largely based on Juana Maria's story. The novel's protagonist, Karana, endures many of the trials that Juana Maria may have faced while alone on San Nicolas. In the 1964 film version of the novel, American actress Celia Kaye played Karana.

== See also ==
- Shanawdithit and Demasduit, the last members of the Beothuk people of Newfoundland and Labrador
- Ishi, the last known member of the Yahi people of California
- Squanto, the last member of the Patuxet people of Massachusetts
- The Man of the Hole, last member of an uncontacted people of Brazil
