= Nicoleño =

Uto-Aztecan people who lived on San Nicolas Island

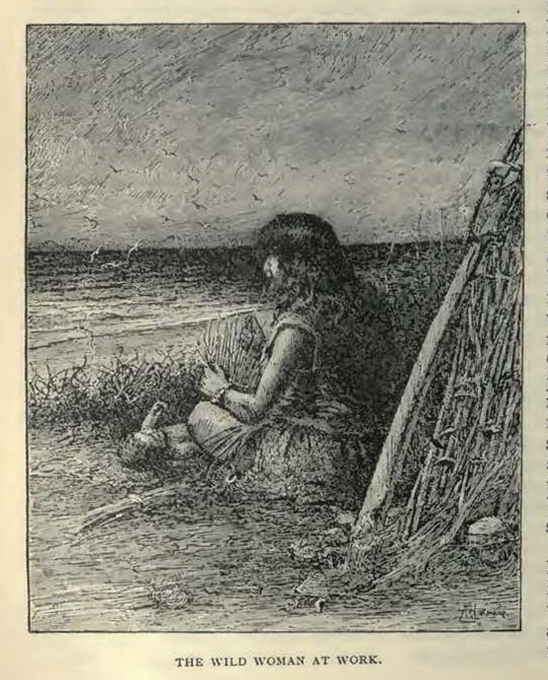

Total population
- 0 (2026, est.)

Regions with significant populations
- California

Languages
- Nicoleño language

Religion
- Catholicism, traditional religion

Related ethnic groups
- Chumash, Tongva, Cupeño, Cahuilla, Luiseño, Acjachemen

The Nicoleño were the people who lived on San Nicolas Island in California at the time of European contact. They spoke a Uto-Aztecan language. The population of the island was "left devastated by a massacre in 1811 by [Russo-Alaskan] sea otter hunters." Its last surviving member, who was given the name Juana Maria, was born before 1811 and died in 1853.

== Prehistory ==
Archaeological evidence suggests that San Nicolas island, like the other Channel Islands, has been populated for at least 10,000 years, though perhaps not continuously. It is thought the Nicoleño people were closely related to the people of Santa Catalina and San Clemente Islands; these were members of the Takic branch of the Uto-Aztecan people and were related to the Tongva of modern-day Los Angeles County. The name Nicoleño has been conventional since its use by Alfred L. Kroeber in Handbook of Indians of California; the Chumash called them the Niminocotch and called San Nicolas Ghalas-at. Their name for themselves is unknown.

== European era ==
The expedition of Juan Rodríguez Cabrillo spotted San Nicolas Island in 1543, but they did not land or make any notes about the inhabitants. In 1602 the Spanish explorer Sebastián Vizcaíno visited San Nicolas and gave it its current name. Little is known of the Nicoleño through the historical record between that date and the early 19th century. By that time, the population appeared to have declined significantly, likely due in part to Spanish missionary recruitment efforts, known to have relocated people from the other Channel Islands to the mainland.

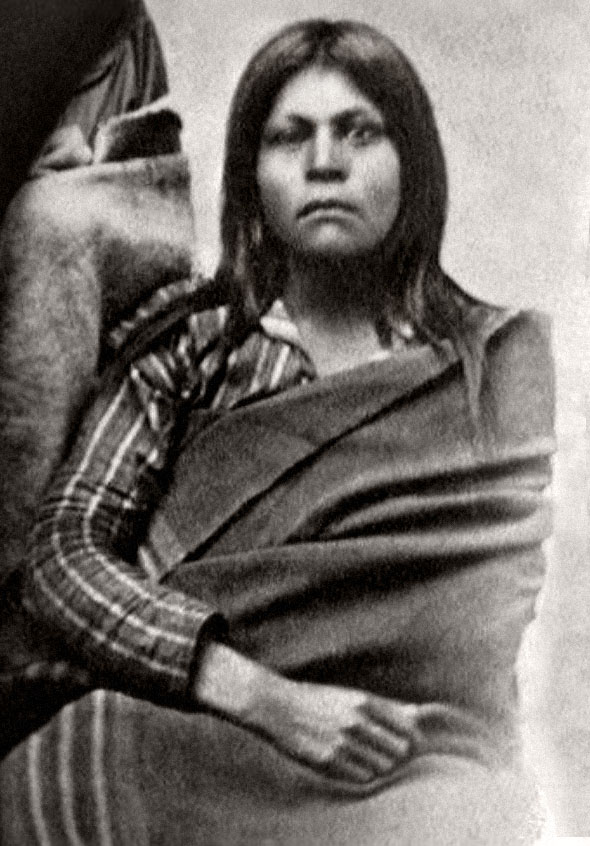
Photograph possibly depicting Juana Maria, the last surviving member of the Nicoleño people

In 1811, the Russian–American Company brig Il’mena brought a party of Aleuts and Russian fur traders from Russian Alaska to San Nicolas island in search of sea otter and seal. They killed many of the Nicoleño men and raped many of the women leaving the population decimated. By the 1830s only around twenty remained; some sources put the number at seven, six women and an old man named Black Hawk. Black Hawk suffered a head injury during the massacre.

Hearing of this, the Santa Barbara Mission on the mainland sponsored a rescue mission, and in late 1835 Captain Charles Hubbard sailed out to the Channel Islands aboard the schooner Peor es Nada. Most of the tribe boarded the ship, but one, the woman later known as Juana Maria, did not arrive before a storm rose and the ship had to return to port. Hubbard was unable to return for Juana Maria at the time as he had received orders to take a shipment of lumber to Monterey, California, and before he could return to Santa Barbara the Peor es Nada hit a heavy board in the mouth of the San Francisco Bay and sank. A lack of other available ships is usually cited as preventing further rescue attempts.

Many of the surviving Nicoleño chose to live at the Mission San Gabriel Arcángel. However, they had no immunity to the diseases they encountered there. Black Hawk became blind shortly after arriving, and died when he fell off a steep bank into the water and drowned. The others had also apparently died by the time Juana Maria was rescued, in early September 1853. After several other attempts at locating her failed, she was found by Captain George Nidever, who took her to the mainland. None of the local Indians could translate her language, and she was taken in by Nidever and his wife. However, she contracted dysentery, injured herself in a fall, and died seven weeks after her arrival.

== Study ==
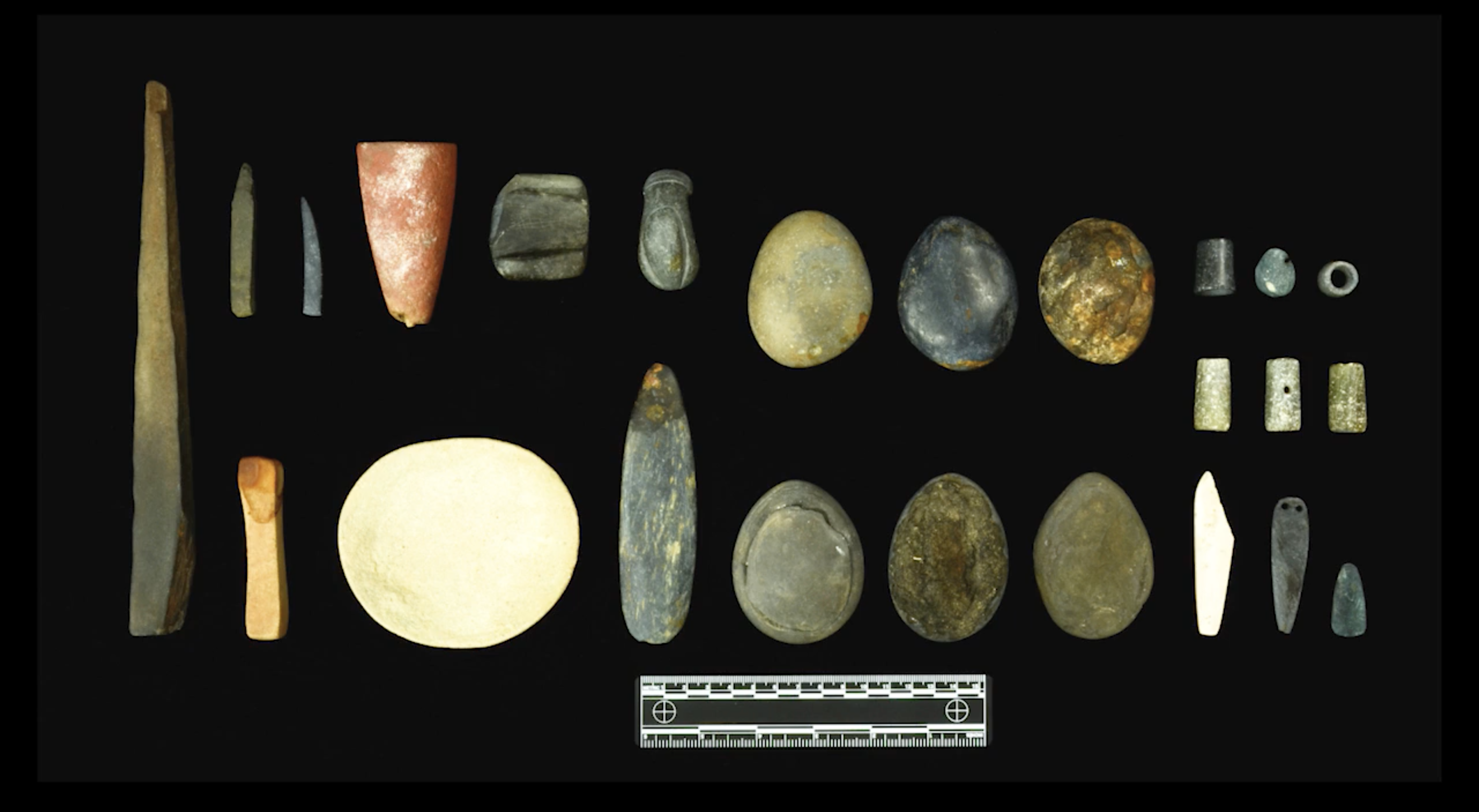
Artifacts from San Nicolas Island, possibly of Nicoleño origin

Most information about the Nicoleño comes through Juana Maria. When Nidever located her, she was living in a round brush enclosure, about 6 feet (1.8 m) in diameter and 5 feet (1.5 m) high, with a narrow opening on one side. She cooked her food over a fire inside her home. Several similar enclosures were still standing at the time, and another type of structure, made of brush walls supported by whale ribs, was also found. Juana Maria hung seal meat from a series of 4–8 ft (1.2–2.4 m) long poles placed around the structures, or from ropes stretched between the poles. Like other California natives, the Nicoleño were apparently skilled basket weavers, and Juana Maria is described as making four different shapes. When found she was wearing a dress made of cormorant skins, decorated with feathers. She had a number of possessions made of sinew and bone.

The first archaeological visit to San Nicolas was by Paul Schumacher for the Smithsonian Institution in 1875. His team uncovered numerous artifacts from surface sites, assumed to be from a later period of Nicoleño culture, as the island's climate is not well suited for preservation. Artifacts collected by these early visitors include grass matting and clothing fragments, bone knives and fishhooks, and soapstone fish and bird effigies. Nicoleño culture was entirely dependent on the ocean for sustenance, as the island was home to only four types of land animals, none of which were valuable for food. The island is home to a large abundance of fish and sea mammals, as well as birds, which the Nicoleño were skilled at catching.

In 1939, the remnants of a whalebone structure attributed to the Lone Woman were documented by Arthur Woodward. In 2009, two Nicoleño redwood boxes were found eroding from a sea cliff by University of Oregon archaeologist Jon Erlandson, with a whale rib marker on top of them. The boxes and associated artifacts were salvaged by Erlandson, René Vellanoweth, Lisa Thomas-Barnett, and Troy Davis, with the contents of the boxes meticulously excavated by Vellanoweth and Thomas-Barnett in a San Nicolas Island archaeology lab. This cache produced roughly 200 artifacts of Nicoleño, Euro-American, and Native Alaskan materials or styles. The historic artifacts found in the boxes suggests that the cache dates to between AD 1815 and 1853 and may very well have been used by the Lone Woman. In 2012, a U.S. Navy archaeologist reported finding a site that could have been Juana Maria's cave.

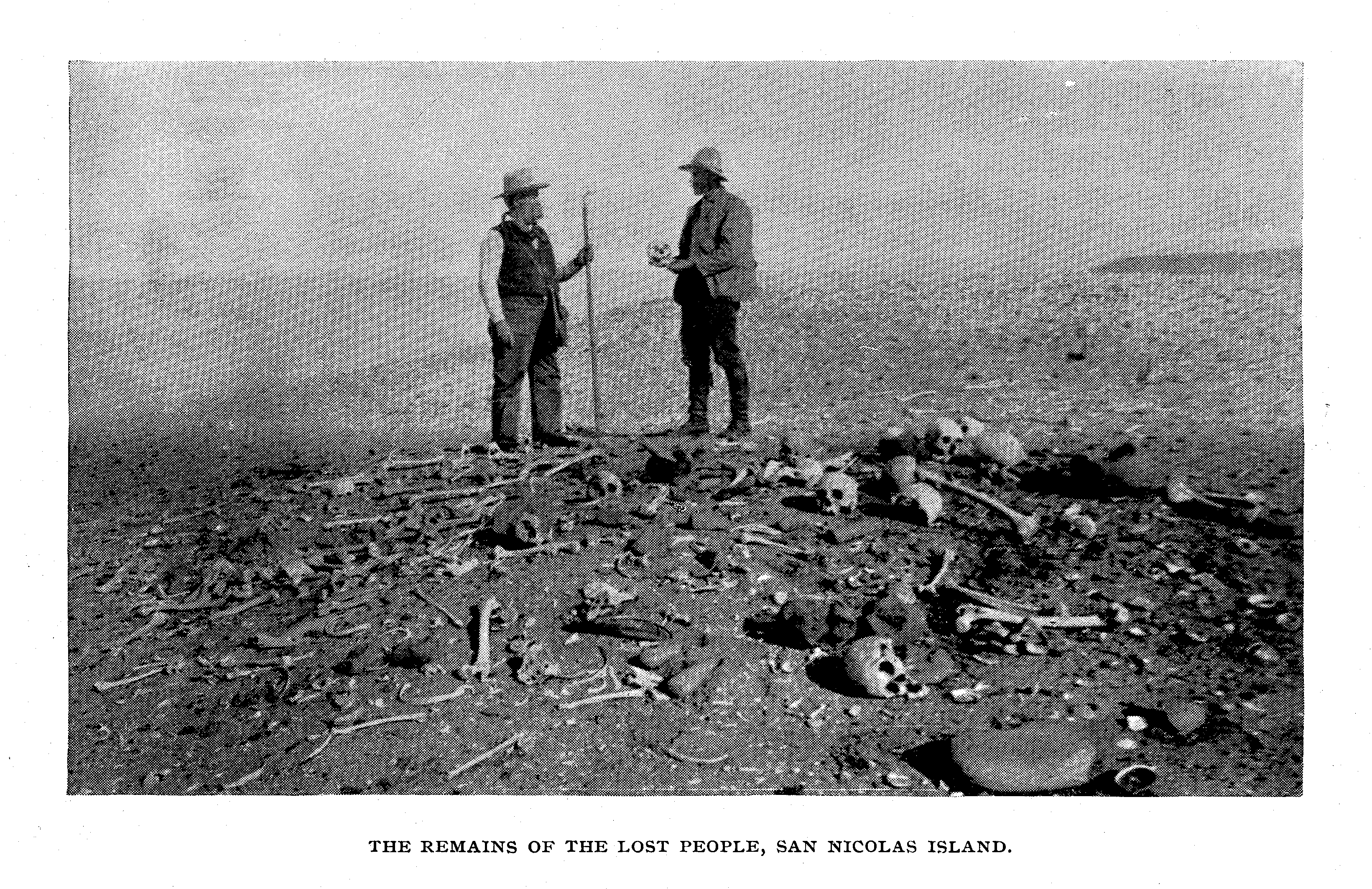
1896 image of Nicoleño remains on San Nicolas island

Over the years, 469 human remains and 436 burial objects have been found on San Nicolas Island. When leaders from the Pechanga Band of Luiseño Mission Indians, a tribe of Luiseños claiming a cultural connection with the Nicoleños, visited the island, they were troubled with the way that the human remains were being handled by excavators. With the approval of the Navy, they established a cultural claim to the human remains and artifacts related to burial.
