= Gibney Beach =

Beach on Saint John, U.S. Virgin Islands

Coordinates: 18°21′09″N 64°46′35″W

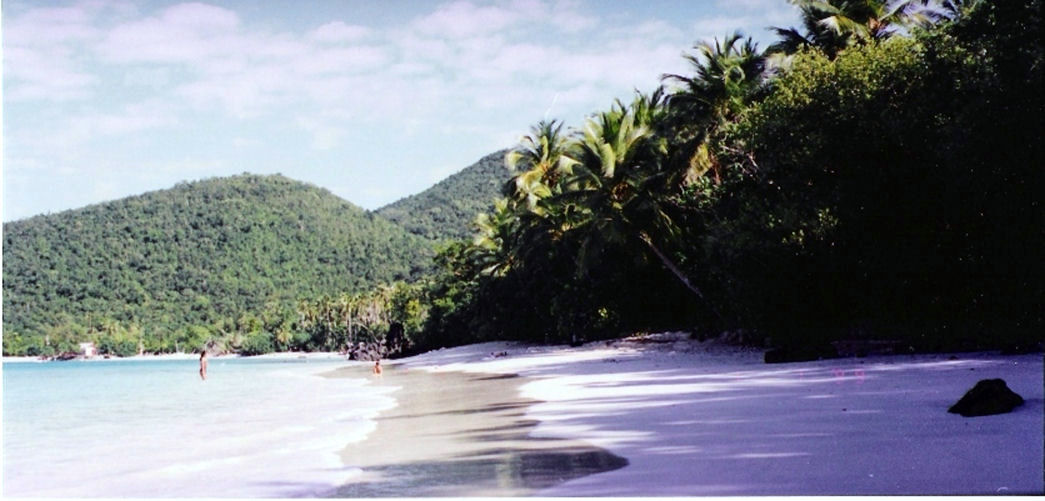
Gibney Beach in 1998

Gibney Beach, or Oppenheimer Beach, is a beach on Hawksnest Bay on northern Saint John in the United States Virgin Islands. The beach's names originate from Nancy Flagg Gibney and J. Robert Oppenheimer and their families, the owners of the beach in the mid-20th century. The beach has been mostly accessible to the public since its acquisition, and a community center has been created on the property, where Oppenheimer’s house used to be.

== History ==
The Taino inhabited St. John's north shore in the period around 1100 CE. They established one of several villages on what is now known as Hawksnest Point, between Hawksnest and Caneel Bay.

Early European settlers named this part of Hawksnest Bay "Fortuna Bay", a name that appears on Peter Lotharios Oxholm's manuscript map, drawn in 1780. This eastern shore of the Bay was part of the large Susannaberg sugar plantation at the top of the watershed. It was split off with Estate Denis Bay and 140 acres (0.57 km^{2}) in 1906, and separated from Denis Bay in 1920. A small bay rum oil still was operational on the property in the late 19th century, and a tiny factory distilled rum from sugarcane for manufacture of the bay rum cologne. John Lindquist, owner of much of St. John's north shore in the early 20th century, planted coconuts, bananas, and other fruit trees on this property, on neighboring Denis Bay, and at his home at Cinnamon Bay.

=== Land area and owners ===
In 1950, former New York City residents Robert Gibney and his wife, Nancy Flagg Gibney, purchased the property. Robert was a writer, artist, and friend of Thomas Merton; Nancy was a feature editor for Vogue. Before the purchase, Gibney Beach was known as Hawksnest Beach. The original 40-acre (160,000 m^{2}) parcel of land the Gibneys purchased has been divided and sold in a number of ways over the years. Some of the beach area is now part of the Virgin Islands National Park. A small piece of land, on the far northeastern section of the beach, was sold in 1957 to J. Robert Oppenheimer, an atomic scientist and member of the Manhattan Project. The house was later refurbished by the government and opened as a community center.

==== The Gibneys ====
Robert and Nancy Gibney came to St. John on their honeymoon in 1946. Robert was 31 at the time and Nancy was 25. They planned to spend a few months in the islands; in order to stay this extended time, Nancy had to quit her job. Robert planned to write a novel while in the islands. The Gibneys rented a small cottage on Cruz Bay Beach. Later, when friends Julius and Cleome Wadsworth, who lived on Denis Bay, moved back to the United States for the summer, the Gibneys stayed in their home rent-free. When the Wadsworths returned the next winter, the Gibneys were not yet ready to leave, so they moved into a shed on Henley Cay, an 11-acre (45,000 m^{2}) island on Caneel Bay. At the time this was the only housing available, and the Gibneys ended up living there for the next three years. In 1950 Robert's father died and left Robert and Nancy enough money to buy land on St. John. They purchased 40 acres (160,000 m^{2}) of land on Hawksnest Bay and made it their own. Their house was built in the center of the beach from rocks found on site. Gibney Beach became home to Robert, Nancy, and their three children. Robert home-schooled all three. He worked for Caneel Bay during the expansion of the resort in the 1950s. In the 1960s he became a librarian in Cruz Bay. Nancy wrote short stories. Women's magazines such as McCall's and Redbook published her works.

Robert died in 1973 and Nancy in 1980; both are interred in a Cruz Bay cemetery. The couple left the beach property to their children; the land was divided among them. Ed Gibney, their firstborn child, is a lifelong resident of Saint John and works as a surveyor. His sister Eleanor is on the board of the St. John Historical Society. She too is a lifelong resident on St. John, having grown up on her family's beachfront property. For 15 years she worked for the Caneel Bay Resort, becoming the chief horticulturalist. She is the author of A Field Guide to Native Trees and Plants of East End, St. John U.S. Virgin Islands. She married Gary Ray and they have two children. The Gibneys' second son, John, died in 2003. He lived on Gibney Beach, planting and tending to a garden of tropical trees. John Gibney's remains are interred on the property within his garden.

==== The Oppenheimers ====
In August 1959, after his Security Hearings, the Oppenheimers resided with John Gibney's family on the remote Caribbean island of St. John. During this period, Oppenheimer, his wife Kitty, and their daughter Toni shared the bedroom of John Gibney and his brother Ed. Subsequently, the Gibney family sold a corner lot of their private land to Oppenheimer.

After living on the beach for seven years, the Gibneys were forced to sell part of their land to J. Robert Oppenheimer in 1957 due to financial problems. Oppenheimer is known as "the father of the atomic bomb". The Gibneys sold the most northeastern part of the land to Oppenheimer and his wife, Kitty, who built a vacation home. After their death, the Oppenheimers left the land to their daughter, Toni. Toni died in 1976 and left the property to "the people of St. John". The land is now a public park. The house was left in disrepair and frequently vandalized until the Virgin Islands government took over the property and created a community center. Now, the center can be rented out by paying a small fee for such events as senior citizen outings, Boy Scout meetings, concerts, picnics, weddings, and birthday parties.

=== Property dispute ===
The Gibneys' property sale to the Oppenheimers created significant controversy between the families and the local community.

To avoid overdevelopment, the Gibneys had a series of deed restrictions placed on the selling of their land. The deed restricted the property to a one-family dwelling. To preserve the natural environment, the Gibneys had to approve the placement of any structure. They also placed deed restrictions that prohibited rental of the property. And they had the right to repurchase the property if and when the Oppenheimers wanted to sell the land. This first right of refusal was the most important part of the deed to the Gibneys. At first, the Gibneys' deed did not seem to restrict the Oppenheimers, but they began renting their vacation cottage soon after it was built, through the local real estate agency. The Gibneys disapproved, and the Oppenheimers argued the tenants they were renting to were "just friends of theirs". When Robert Oppenheimer died, Kitty began construction on a tool shed on the property line between the Gibneys and the Oppenheimers, which was too close to the beach according to the Gibneys. That Christmas, both buildings the Oppenheimers built were again rented to friends. A number of lawsuits followed, and the Virgin Islands Police Department was called to intervene on several occasions.

After Kitty died, the Oppenheimers' land was left to their daughter Toni. Toni later died by suicide and left the land to "the people of St. John for a public park and recreation". The Gibneys rejected the idea of a public park and expressed to Robert Meyner, Toni's executor to estate, their right of first refusal. In Meyner's responses he declared that their right of first refusal applied only to a sale, not a donation. The Gibneys fought back, warning Meyner they would engage in a new deed saying only a one-family residence could be built. Meyner responded that there would be no need for future buildings.

Even with the deterioration of the building and property after Toni's death, the Gibneys persisted in their fight. They wanted to regain control of the property, but faced numerous delays. When Robert Gibney died in 1973, Nancy kept fighting. She died in 1980 with the conflict unresolved. The National Park Beach took over the property at Hawksnest Beach and a parking lot, changing area, pit toilets, barbecue grills, tables, benches, and sheltered pavilions were added. The beach's visiting population grew. The land became known as Hawksnest Beach and the smaller section Gibney Beach. The Virgin Islands government took ownership of the Oppenheimers' land. They renovated the house and made improvements to the land; it is now a community center. A large iron gate was placed at the entrance to the Gibneys' property on the North Shore Road to prevent cars from entering. Two driveways serve as the entrances to the Gibneys' private property.

=== National Park Service ===
Today, much of Gibney Beach is under the stewardship of the United States Virgin Islands National Park. The 2 acres (8,100 m^{2}) of the waterfront land were the first major acquisition by the Virgin Islands National Park since January 4, 1979, when it acquired the Annaberg estate. On August 15, 1997, Robert and Nancy Gibney's children optioned their portion of the beachfront property to The Trust of Public Land, an organization working in partnership with The Friends of the Virgin Islands National Park. Friends is a nonprofit organization dedicated to protecting and preserving the natural and cultural resources of the Virgin Islands’ National Parks. As the official private sector partner to the Park, Friends is a membership organization that raises funds from individuals, corporations, and foundations to supplement the Park's budget. At the time, the remaining 5 acres (20,000 m^{2}) of the Gibneys' land was valued at over $3.5 million. The Gibneys were not concerned about the money; they agreed to sell the land to the Trust for less than the market price. It became clear that without creative compromise, there would not be adequate resources to compensate Ed and Eleanor Gibney. Consequently, Ed agreed to subdivide his property to include all of his beachfront but somewhat less than his total acreage. Eleanor agreed to retain a right to remain on her property for 30 years in exchange for the reduced price.

== Wildlife ==
St. John has 140 species of birds, 302 species of fish, 7 species of amphibians, 22 species of mammals, and 740 species of plants. There are also about 50 coral species, many gorgonians, and sponges. The only mammal native to Saint John is the bat, but many non-native animals have been introduced to the island over the years, such as dogs, cats, donkeys, sheep, deer, and pigs.

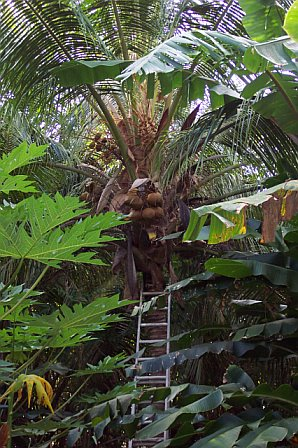
Coconuts grown on Gibney Beach.

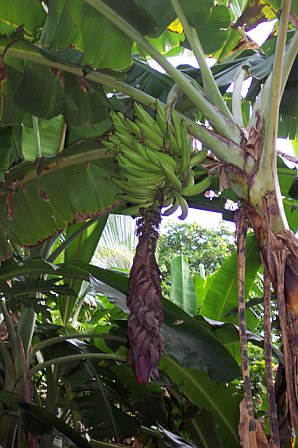
Bananas grown on Gibney Beach.

=== Plant life ===
Inside the forests off the shore of Gibney Beach, there is also an abundance of plant life. Gibney Beach lies on the eastern coast of the island and is characterized by dry forest vegetation. Cacti such as the barbed-wire cactus (Acanthocereus tetragonus), prickly pear (Opuntia spp.), organ pipe cactus (Pilosocereus armatus, syn. P. royenii var. amatus), and Turk's cap cactus (Melocactus intortus) are prominent in the area. These cacti grow alongside shrubs, such as maran (Croton flavens var. rigidula), and thorn bushes like casha (Acacia tortuosa) and catch-and-keep (Acacia retusa). The thorny nature of these forests make them difficult to navigate. Mangrove forests can also be found off Gibney Beach. Mangrove trees alter the shoreline, changing salinity, tidal inundation and oxygenation of the soil. Red mangroves (Rhizophora mangle) are the most common and grow in the ocean. They have specialized prop roots that protect shorelines and serve as nurseries for many marine animals. Other mangrove species that can be found on the coast are the black mangrove (Avicennia germinans), white mangrove (Laguncularia racemosa), and buttonwood mangrove (Conocarpus erectus). Other more exotic trees can be found in residential areas off Gibney Beach. Gardens often include orchids, heliconia, ylang-ylang trees, and fruit trees such as coconut, star fruit, bananas, and mango.

=== On the coast ===
The coast of Gibney Beach is also full of wildlife. The sand that makes up Gibney beach is made primarily from two sources, marine algae and living coral reefs. Sea turtles occasionally visit the beach to lay eggs. Sandpipers and other shore birds are often on the beach, searching for small crabs and mollusks that live beneath the sand.

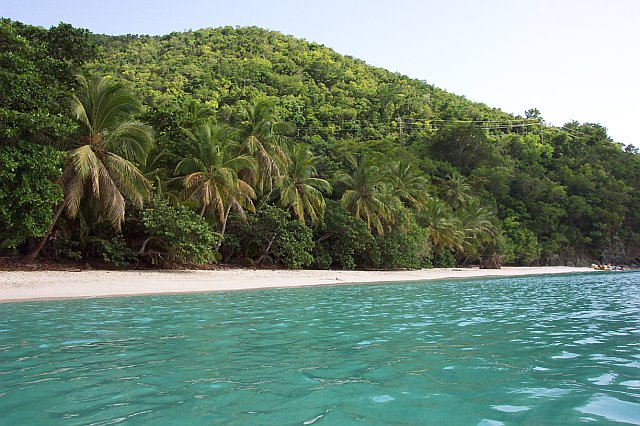
A view from the ocean on Gibney Beach.

=== Ocean life ===
Gibney Beach is not a big attraction for snorkelers because much of the marine life off Gibney Beach was significantly damaged during a heavy rain during the excavation for the Myrah Keating Smith Community Health Center. Soil was washed down into the bay and resulted in turbidity that damaged much of the coral life in the bay. The coral reefs are slowly coming back to life, bringing more animal marine life with them.

Gibney Beach's reefs include brain coral, elkhorn, staghorn, pillar coral, boulder coral, and fire coral. These are colorful and contain a variety of fish and other aquatic creatures. Atop these large coral bodies sit sea fans, sea whips and sea plumes.

Common fish off Gibney Beach include goatfish, grunts, tangs, parrotfish, angelfish, squirrelfish, trunkfish, trumpetfish, yellowtail snapper, blue runners, groupers, butterflyfish, damselfish, squirrelfish, porcupinefish, wrasses, octopuses, and eels. The reefs also house a number of invertebrates, including sponges, starfish, sea urchins, sea worms, crabs, lobsters, and sea anemones.

== Tourism ==
Gibney Beach is on North Shore Road (Route 20), about 2.1 miles (3.4 km) from Mongoose Junction in downtown Cruz Bay. There are no signs that lead to Gibney, no parking, and no facilities. There is only a small gravel road leading down to the beach, blocked off by a tall white gate to keep cars out. There is a small opening in the gate allowing entrance by foot. In front of the gate, a small portion of the road is open where about four cars will tightly fit. Even though it is open to the public, the beach has a very private feel.

Gibney Beach neighbors Hawksnest Beach. The entrance is the third driveway on the left if passing Hawksnest. To the right of the driveway is the Oppenheimer part of the beach. The southwestern part is Gibney. While they are nearly the same beach, the Oppenheimer house is open to the public but the Gibney house sections are private. In the Virgin Islands, public domain property is from the sea to the first line of vegetation. Behind the first line of vegetation, the Gibney Beach property belongs to the Gibney family.

=== Villas ===
Two villas on the beach are available for rent by visitors and tourists: the Gibney Garden Cottage and the Gibney Beach Cottage, both directly on the beach. The cottages can be rented separately or together. Botanical gardens surrounding the villas are filled with orchids, heliconia, ylang ylang trees and fruit trees consisting of exotic plants and fruits, including coconuts and star fruit.

Gibney beach has limited parking, and there are no hotels or condos to rent on the land. A few homes within easy walking distance of Gibney Beach are popular with visitors and tourists. Tourists also have a scenic and easy drive on paved roads into shops and restaurants of Cruz Bay nearby.

== Activities ==
For simply relaxing on the beach and enjoying the nature of St. John, many people, both tourists and locals alike, visit Gibney Beach for its quieter atmosphere. This private, “off-the-beaten-path” quality of Gibney Beach is because there are no water sport rentals, eateries, and only limited parking available. Sea grape trees and palms line the shore creating shade. There are tree-covered picnic tables for those who wish to bring their own meal and enjoy family and friends at the beach. There is no admission charge at Gibney Beach.

=== Snorkeling ===
Although it is not the favored snorkeling area in St. John, the most popular activity at Gibney Beach is snorkeling. This is due to the accessibility of waters and the waters’ appropriate conditions for the most novice to advanced snorkeling. The snorkeling here is also popular because of the vast array of coral and fish that are visible on the fringing reef in the area. In addition to the plants and animals, there is a sunken sailboat that is accessible to explore while snorkeling. The best snorkeling here is during the summer.

The Community Center at Gibney Beach was once the home of the Oppenheimer family. Now this portion of the beach is public and offers the best access to the reef. Here, the white sand is soft and the water is shallow and ideal for beginners. For more advanced snorkeling, one can continue north on the eastern coastline to Perkins Cay and Denis Bay. The deeper waters range from six to ten feet deep.

Much of the colorful reef life is very close to the shore. It is possible to see sections of boulder, fire, brain, and elkhorn coral. Spottings of both small and medium schools are fish are common. The fish close to the shore, visible while snorkeling, include: parrotfish, squirrelfish, trunkfish, trumpetfish, goatfish, grunt, and tang. There are also predator fish like the yellowtail snapper and the blue runner.

=== Local entertainment ===
Local reggae and calypso bands sometimes perform at Gibney Beach at the Community Center.
