= 1733 slave insurrection on St. John =

Revolt in the Danish West Indies

- Part of slave rebellions in the Americas
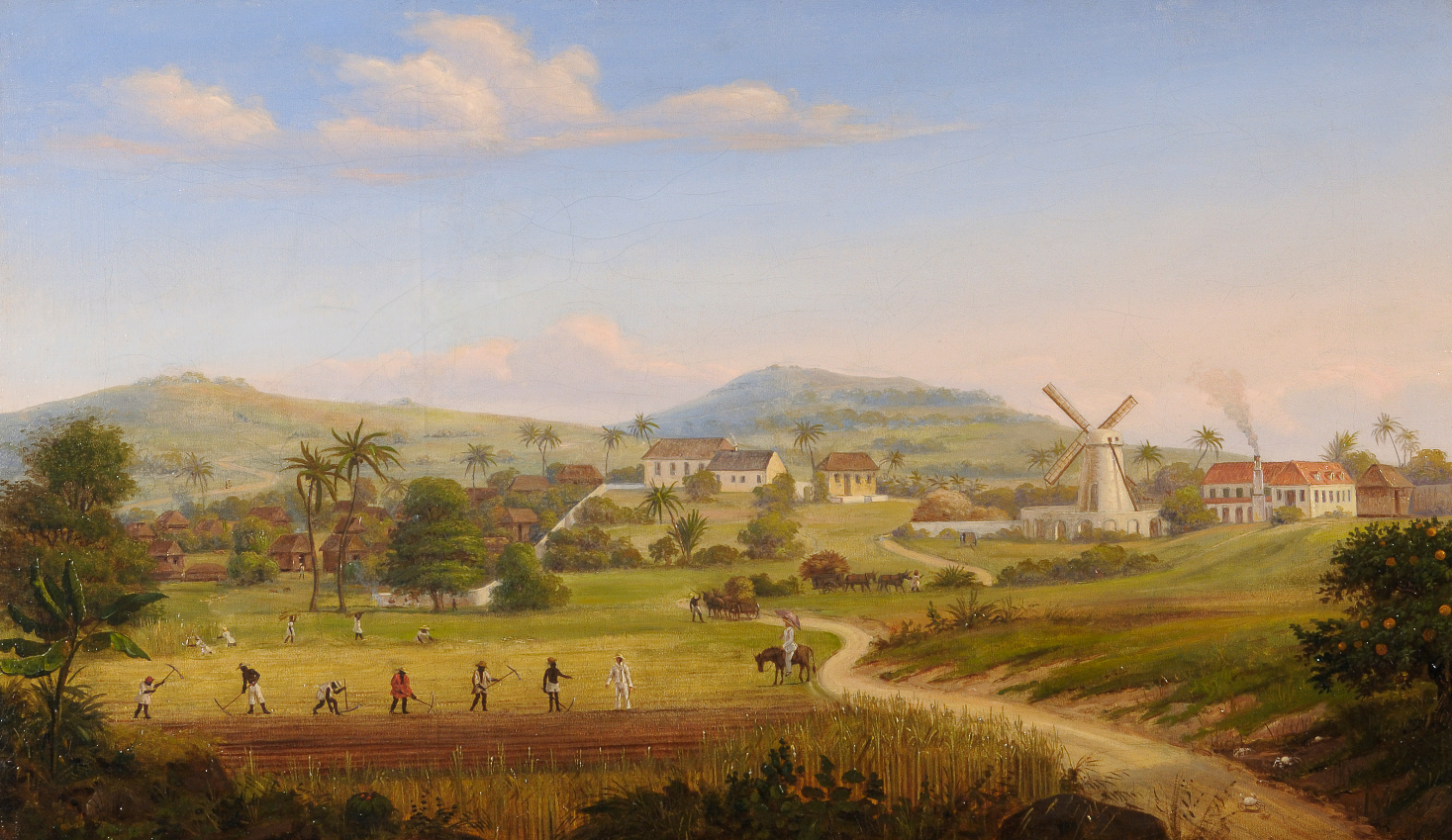
- Painting of a plantation in the Danish West Indies
Date	23 November 1733 – 25 August 1734
Location	Sankt Jan, Danish West Indies (present-day Saint John, U.S. Virgin Islands)
Result	Uprising suppressed

Belligerents
Danish West India Company; Martinique	Rebel slaves (Akwamu natives)

Commanders and leaders
(Denmark–Norway) Phillip Gardelin (Denmark–Norway) Johannes Sødtmann (Denmark–Norway) John Jansen (Denmark–Norway) Lieven Jansen (Denmark–Norway) Øttingen	June; Kanta; Bolombo; Aquashie; Breffu

Strength
Hundreds	150

The 1733 slave insurrection on St. John (Danish: Slaveoprøret på Sankt Jan), also known as the Slave Uprising of 1733, was a slave insurrection started on Sankt Jan in the Danish West Indies (now St. John, United States Virgin Islands) on November 23, 1733, when 150 African slaves from Akwamu, in present-day Ghana, revolted against the owners and managers of the island's plantations.

Led by Breffu, an enslaved woman from Ghana, and lasting several months into August 1734, the slave rebellion was one of the earliest and longest slave revolts in the Americas. The Akwamu slaves captured the fort in Coral Bay and took control of most of the island. They intended to resume crop production under their control.

Planters regained control by the end of May 1734, after the Akwamu were defeated by several hundred better-armed French and Swiss troops sent in April from Martinique, a French colony. The colonial militia continued to hunt down maroons and finally declared the rebellion at an end in late August 1734.

== Background ==
=== Slave trade ===
When the Spanish first occupied the West Indies, they used the indigenous people as slave labor but most died as a result of infectious disease, overwork, and war. In the late 17th century, various other European powers competed for control over the island after the Spanish had abandoned control. The Danes claimed Saint John in 1718 as a result of a period of negotiation, but numerous Dutch planters stayed on the island. While some plantations had been started, there was not an adequate supply of laborers among the settlers. Young Danish people could not be persuaded to immigrate to the West Indies in great enough numbers to provide a reliable source of labor. Attempts to use indentured servants from Danish prisons as plantation workers were not successful. Failure to procure plantation labor from other sources made importing slaves from Africa the main supply of labor on the Danish West Indies islands. Danish ships carried about 85,000 African slaves to the New World from 1660 to 1806.

The Danes embarked on the African slave trade in 1657. By the beginning of the 18th century, the Danish West India and Guinea Company had consolidated their slave operation to the vicinity of Accra (now in Ghana) on the Guinea coast. The Akwamu had conquered the Accra and established dominance on trading routes into the interior. They became the dominant Akan state in the district of Accra and were known for being "heavy-handed in dealing with the tribes they had conquered", taking captives and selling them as slaves, and keeping numerous women as concubines in various villages. After the Akwamu king died, rival tribes in the area attacked the weakened Akwamu nation, and by 1730 they defeated the people. In retaliation for years of oppression, their enemies sold many Akwamu people into slavery to the Danes; they were transported to plantations in the West Indies, including estates on St. John.

At the time of the 1733 slave rebellion, hundreds of Akwamu people were among the slave population on St. John. Approximately 150 Akwamu were involved in the insurrection; other African ethnic groups did not support it, and some were loyal to planters.

=== Danish occupation of St. John ===
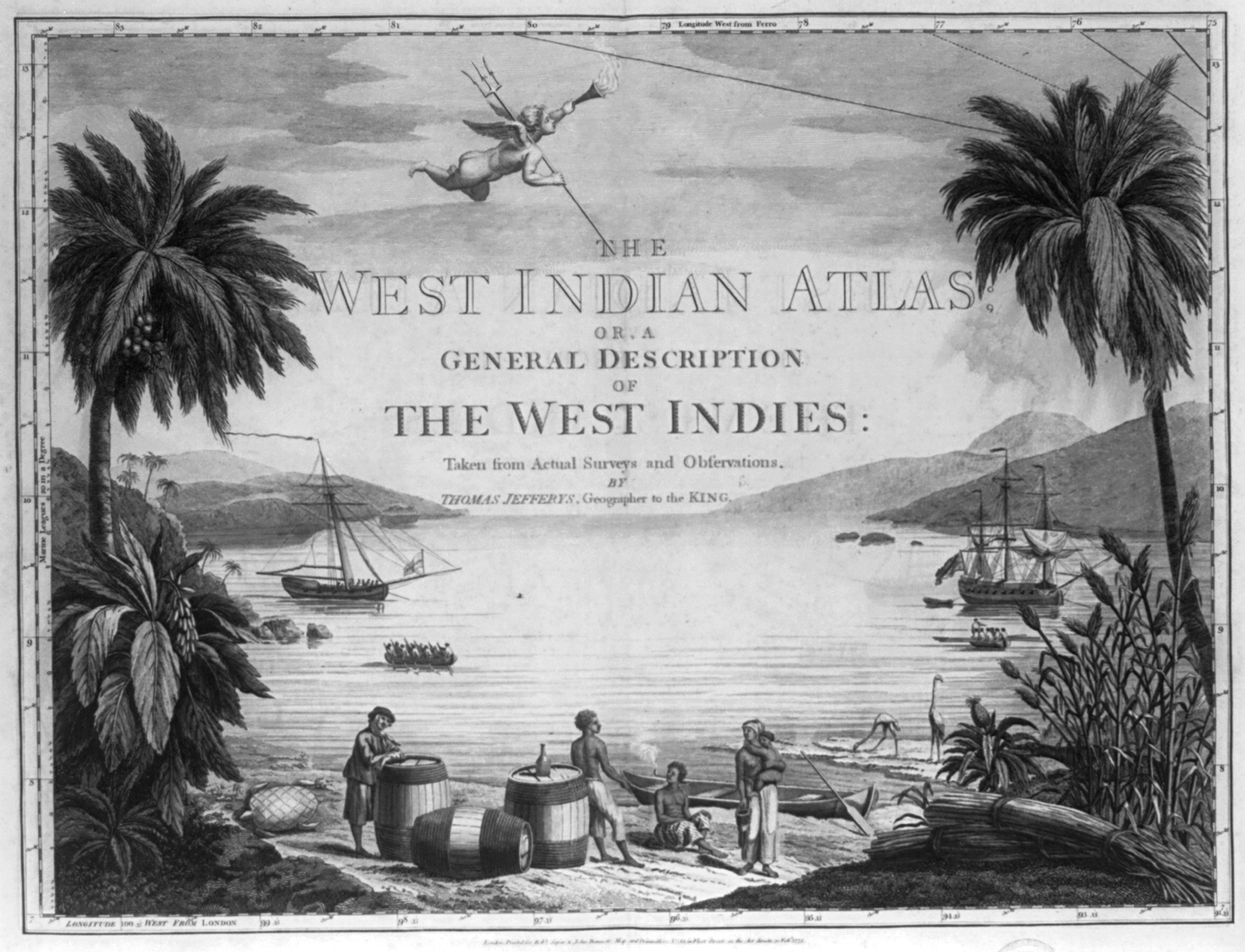
West Indies harbor

In 1718 the Danish claimed the island of St. John to develop sugar plantations and crops such as indigo and cotton; there was an especially great demand for sugar and prices were high in Europe. Dutch planters were still important on the island. By mid-1733, planters had developed 109 plantations, and slaveholders owned more than 1,000 African slaves on St. John. One-fifth of the plantations were then devoted to sugar; by the end of the century, most would be, and the total slave population would be 2,500. In 1733 the population of African slaves on St. John was more than five times as large as that of the European inhabitants: 1,087 slaves and 206 whites. Many of St. John's plantations were owned by people residing on St. Thomas. These absentee landowners hired overseers to manage their lands and slaves on St. John. Under these conditions, overseer cruelty flourished. The Danish West India Company provided only six soldiers for the defense of St. John, which supplemented the local white militia.

=== Marooning ===
In 1733, in response to harsh living conditions from drought, a severe hurricane, and crop failure from insect infestation, many slaves in the West Indies, including on St. John, left their plantations to maroon, hiding in the woods. In October 1733, slaves from the Suhm estate on the eastern part of St. John, and the company estate and other plantations around the Coral Bay area absconded. The colonial legislature passed the Slave Code of 1733 to try to enforce obedience from slaves. Penalties for disobedience were severe public punishment, including whipping, amputation of limbs, or death by hanging. A large section of the code was intended to prevent slaves from escaping and stop them from setting up independent communities. When slaves tried to revolt or escape from the plantations, often they were quickly caught and either their ear was cut off, or in severe cases, a few limbs.

== Slave revolt ==
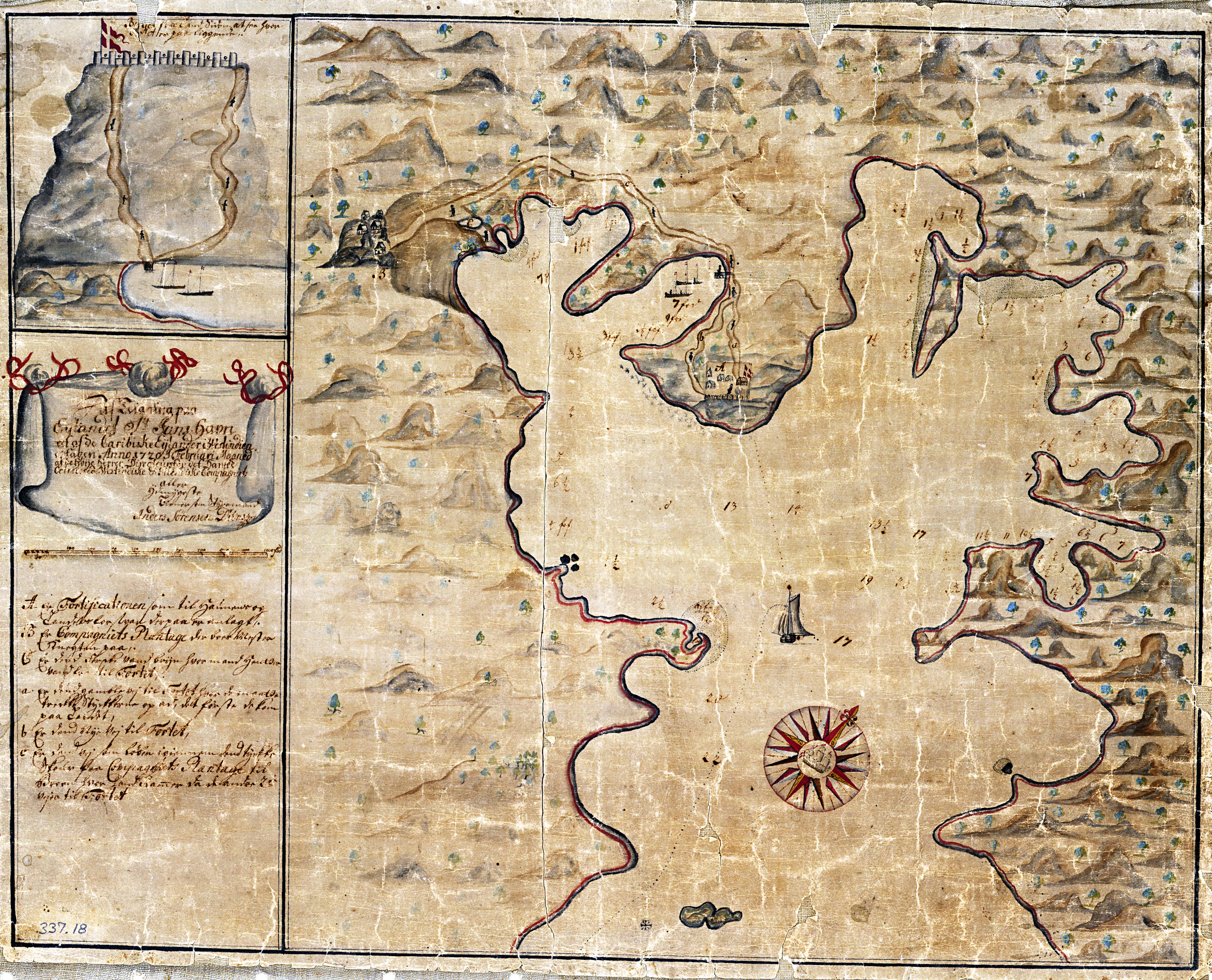
Map of Coral Bay, 1720.

In their homeland, many of the Akwamu had been nobles, wealthy merchants, or other powerful members of their society. These high-ranking Akwamu developed plans to instigate an insurrection, take control of St. John and rule it. They planned to continue the production of sugar and other crops by using Africans of other tribes as slave laborers. An Akwamu chief, King June, a field slave and foreman on the Sødtmann estate, led the rebellion. Other leaders were Okanta, King Bolombo, Prince Akwasi, and Obrafuor. According to a report by French planter Pierre Pannet, the rebel leaders met regularly at night for some time to develop the plan.

=== Events on November 23, 1733 ===
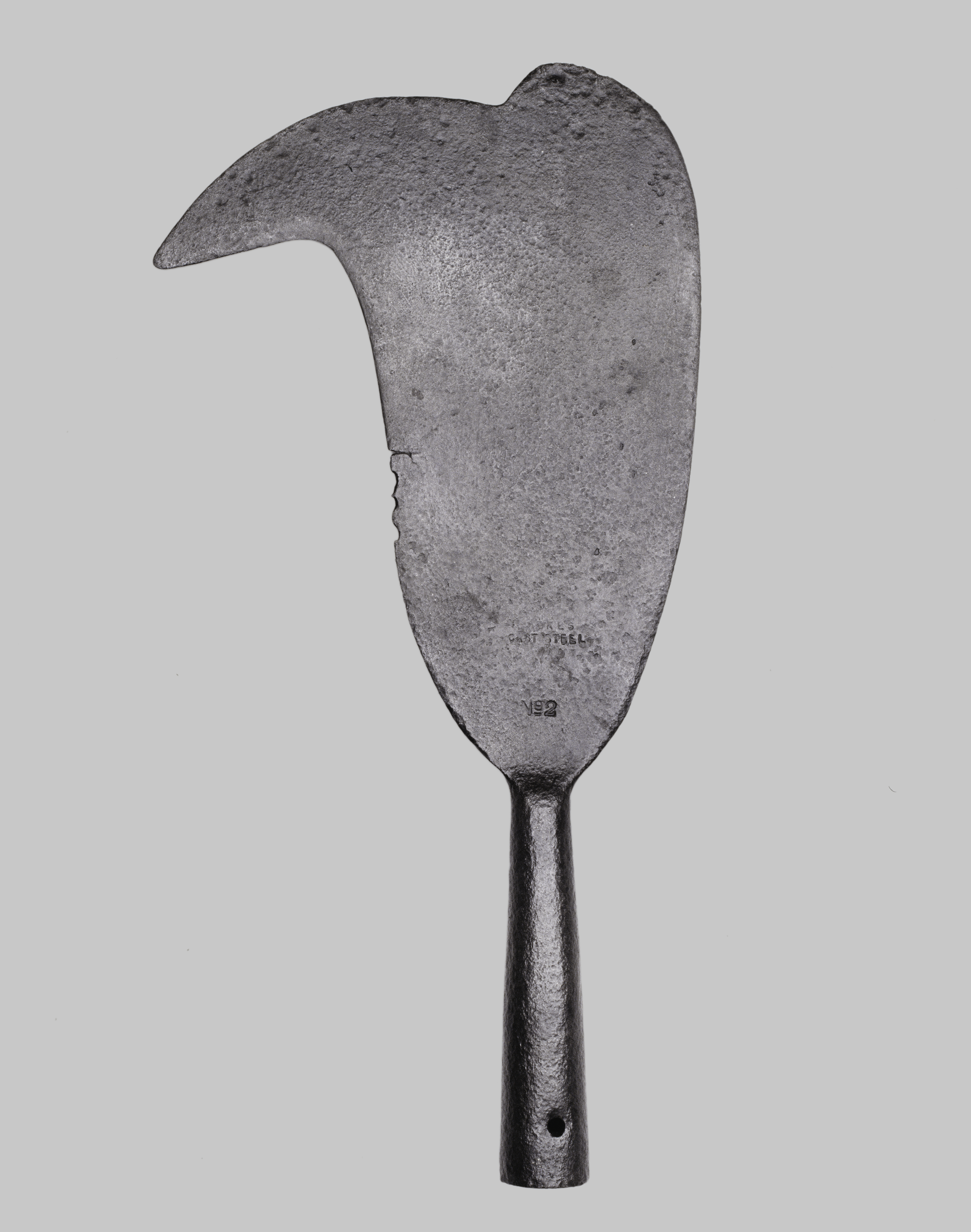
Cane knife from the Danish West Indies; knives like this one were used by rebelling slaves.

The 1733 slave insurrection started with open acts of rebellion by slaves on November 23, 1733, at the Coral Bay plantation owned by Magistrate Johannes Sødtmann. An hour later, other slaves were admitted into the fort at Coral Bay to deliver wood, a regular event. They had hidden knives in the lots, which they used to kill most of the soldiers at the fort. Soldier John Gabriel escaped to St. Thomas and alerted Danish officials to the revolt. A group of rebels under the leadership of King June stayed at the fort to maintain control; another group took control of the estates in the Coral Bay area after hearing the signal shots from the fort's cannon. The slaves killed many of the whites on these plantations. The rebel slaves moved along to the north shore of the island. In each area, they avoided widespread destruction of property since they intended to take over the estates and resume crop production for their benefit.

=== Accounts of the rebel attacks ===
After gaining control of the Suhm, Sødtmann, and Company estates, the rebels spread out over the rest of the island. The Akwamu attacked the Cinnamon Bay Plantation located on the central north shore. Landowners John and Lieven Jansen and a group of loyal slaves resisted the attack, holding off the advancing rebels with gunfire. The Jansens were able to retreat to their waiting boat and escape to Durloe's plantation. The loyal Jansen slaves also escaped. The rebels looted the Jansen plantation and moved on to confront whites taking refuge at Durloe's plantation. Defenders repelled the slaves' attack at Durloe's, and many planters and their families escaped to St. Thomas, 5–9 miles (8.0–14.5 km) by sea.

=== End of the rebellion and aftermath ===
Danish officials appealed for help to French colonists at Martinique, located 324 miles (521 km) away. Two French ships arrived from there at St. John on April 23, 1734, carrying several hundred French and Swiss troops to try to take control from the rebels. With their firepower and troops, they had restored planters' rule of the island by May 27. The French ships returned to Martinique on June 1, leaving the local militia to track down the remaining rebels, which they did over the next three months.

The slave insurrection was considered ended on August 25, 1734 when Sergeant Øttingen captured the remaining maroon rebels. The loss of life and property from the insurrection caused many St. John landowners to move to St. Croix, a nearby island bought by the Danish from the French in 1733. Four ships carried planters and their families from Charlotte Amalie in August. While they found St. Croix to be a richer land, they had to have their slaves clear the jungle before being able to live there readily.

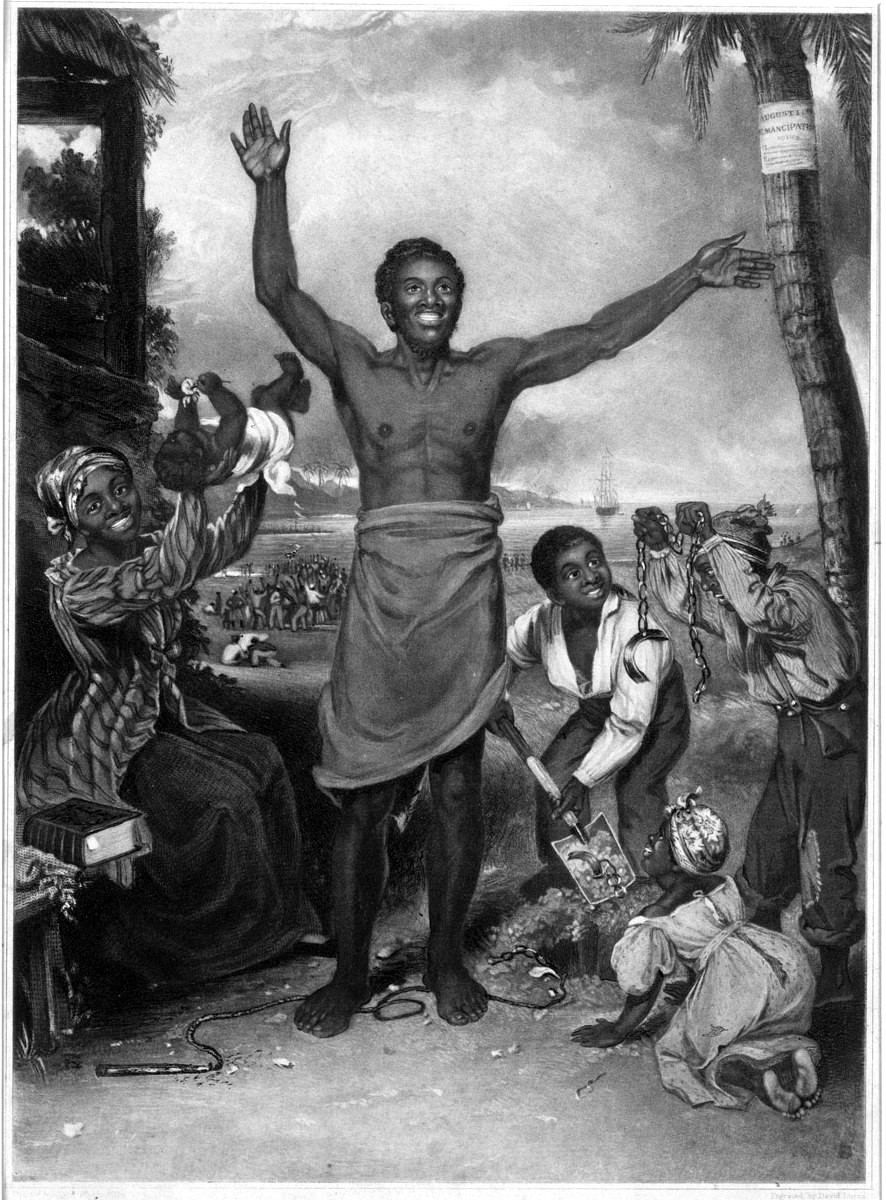
Freedom 100 years later

Franz Claasen, a loyal slave of the van Stell family, was deeded the Mary Point Estate for alerting the family to the rebellion and assisting in their escape to St. Thomas. Franz Claasen's land deed was recorded August 20, 1738, by Jacob van Stell, making Claasen the first "Free Colored" landowner on St. John.

Denmark-Norway ended the African slave trade in the Danish West Indies on January 1, 1803, but slavery continued on the islands. When the British government abolished slavery in the British West Indies in 1833, slaves on St. John began escaping to nearby Tortola and other British West Indian islands, where they were given refuge by the local inhabitants. On May 24, 1840, eleven slaves from St. John stole a boat and escaped to Tortola during the night. The eight men (Charles Bryan, James Jacob, Adam [alias Cato], Big David, Henry Law, Paulus, John Curay), and three women (Kitty, Polly, and Katurah) were from the Annaberg plantation and ten Leinster Bay estates. Brother Schmitz, the local Moravian missionary, was sent to Tortola by the St. John police to persuade the slaves to return. After meeting with British officials in Tortola and the runaway slaves, Schmitz returned to St. John to relay the slaves' resolve to stay away because of abusive treatment by the overseers on the plantations. After planters replaced those overseers, Charles Bryan, his wife Katurah, and James Jacobs returned to work at Leinster Bay. Kitty, Paulus, David, and Adam moved to St. Thomas. Henry Law, Petrus, and Polly stayed on Tortola. John Curry relocated to Trinidad. None of the runaway slaves were punished.

Slaves and free blacks petitioned the colonial government and Denmark to abolish slavery. On July 3, 1848, 114 years after the slave insurrection, enslaved Afro-Caribbeans of St. Croix held a non-violent, mass demonstration seeking the abolition of slavery. Governor-General Peter von Scholten declared emancipation throughout the Danish West Indies.

The Consolidated Appropriations Act, 2023 directed the placement of a commemorative plaque at Ram Head Peak.

== Representation in other media ==
- A historical novel, Night of the Silent Drums: A Narrative of Slave Rebellion on the Virgin Islands (Scribners 1975), by John L. Anderson. It tells the story of the revolt based on careful research and fills in the blank spaces with plausible events. The author was an authority on the St. John Rebellion and also an able historical novelist.
- The young-adult novel My Name Is Not Angelica (1989), by Scott O'Dell, explores the revolt and its aftermath through the eyes of a young African woman, born as Raisha.
- The science fiction novel The Lesson by Cadwell Turnbull uses the slave revolt and aftermath as a backdrop for the earliest memories of the Ynaa race on the islands.
