= The Amethyst Ring =

1983 novel by Scott O'Dell

- First edition cover
- Author: Scott O'Dell
- Genre: Historical fiction
- Publisher: Houghton Mifflin
- Publication date: April 27, 1983
- ISBN: 0-395-33886-7

The Amethyst Ring is a 1983 historical novel by American writer Scott O'Dell, the third in the trilogy started by The Captive and Feathered Serpent.

== Plot summary ==
Julián Estaban, who is impersonating the Mayan god Kukulcán, fights and escapes from a powerful gold hungry conquistador, Hernán Cortés. Kukulcán's followers captured Rodrigo Perdoza, a bishop carrying a message to Cortés to detain Julián. Julián wants to be a priest and asks the bishop many times to make him one, but in the end Perdoza allows himself to be sacrificed by the Mayan priest. Julián takes the bishop's amethyst ring. Cortés attacks and captures Kukulcán's city, the City of the Seven Serpents, but Julián escapes to a friendly large village and helps them harvest and trade pearls. He then goes to a smaller trading town and partners with Tzom Zambac and they have a successful feathered cloak business. Fearing betrayal from Tzom, he leaves and eventually finds Francisco Pizarro, a conquistador who is taking a band of Spaniards to get gold from the Inca. They capture the Incan king Atahualpa, who has a room filled with gold to pay his ransom. The Spaniards try and kill him anyway. Julián leaves the group because of his disagreements with the trial. He searches for Chima, a daughter of Atahualpa, whom he has fallen in love with. He finds her and she rejects him because he is a Spaniard. Julián then uses all of his gold to sail back to Seville. There he meets Cantú the Dwarf, who is now very wealthy from gold. Cantú gives Julián a lot of gold, but he joins the Brothers of the Poor and gives it all to them.

== Reception ==
The Reading Teacher's review said, "I don't know whether Scott O'Dell's The Amethyst Ring will become a classic, or even whether it will be widely read now. But it is a tantalizing tale, based on a true one... O'Dell lays out mural after mural, telling us what happened in each one, but he's a Sphinx when it comes to pronouncing judgments. That aside, he is a great storyteller and Julián is a great character."

Kirkus Reviews also praised the book, saying that Julián's character development "and the small choices Julian [sic] makes along the way, have remained the compelling focus of a trilogy crackling with intrigue, historical spectacle, and the conflict of cultures that confounds his loyalties."

However, the book was criticized for its treatment of pre-Columbian cultures. Isabel Schon wrote in Journal of Reading, "It is obvious that O'Dell, like many of us, is fascinated with the Mayan, Aztec, and Inca cultures. Thus, I view it as a real tragedy that in The Captive (1979), The Feathered Serpent (1981), and The Amethyst Ring (1983), a trilogy that begins with a pre-Columbian legend, he chose to dwell on only negative aspects of the Mayan culture... The trilogy is indeed a fast moving story of violence and intrigue; it is regrettable, however, that many of its young readers will be exposed to pre-Columbian cultures and the amazing conquest of Mexico through the half-truths and exaggerations of a dilettante historian."
