= The King's Fifth =

1966 children's historical novel by Scott O'Dell

- First edition
- Author: Scott O'Dell
- Language: English
- Genre: Children's novel
- Publisher: Houghton Mifflin
- Publication date: September 1966
- Publication place: United States
- Media type: Print (Hardcover, Paperback)
- Pages: 272 pp (hardcover)
- ISBN: 0-395-06963-7 (hardcover), ISBN 0-440-94538-0 (paperback)
- OCLC: 301963

The King's Fifth (1966) is a children's historical novel by Scott O'Dell It describes, from the point of view of a teenage Spanish Conquistador, how the European search for gold in the New World of the Americas affected people's lives and minds. The title refers to the one fifth share of spoils expected by the Spanish Crown.

== Plot ==
The story takes place in a time when the Spanish adventurers, known as Conquistadors, colonised the New World of the Americas, in search of the mythical gold treasures of the dethroned Native Americans.

Characters:

- Estéban de Sandoval: a teenage mapmaker to the expedition to Cibola to find the gold.
- Zia Troyano: a younger teenage Native American guide.
- Captain Blas de Mendoza (very loosely based on Antonio de Mendoza) - an aristocrat in search of gold.
- Father Francisco: a priest to the expedition who joined as a missionary and an explorer.
- Roa and Zuñiga: part of a trio of musicians who are Mendoza's cronies.

== Influence ==
While the book is sometimes cited as the inspiration for the cartoon TV series The Mysterious Cities of Gold, that show's creator, Jean Chalopin, has stated that only the names of its primary characters were drawn from the book.

The book is also a slight influence in the Choose Your Own Adventure Time Machine's 1987 book Quest for the Cities of Gold, as the reader meets Esteban at different points.

== Awards and nominations ==
- Newbery Honor Book, 1967
- Federal Republic of Germany Jugendbuchpreis, 1970
