= Gifft Hill School =

Gifft Hill School is a non-profit independent school located on Gifft Hill on the island of St. John, U.S. Virgin Islands. The school serves toddler-age students through 12th graders.

== History ==
The school that's known today as Gifft Hill School has its roots in two St. John schools.

In 1978, Pine Peace School was founded by four community members as a preschool that served a handful of students. The school grew quickly, adding both students and grades with each passing year. After moving four times in four years, Pine Peace settled onto donated land on Gifft Hill, where the Lower Campus, home to the toddler class through fifth grade, remains today. Through the 1980s and 1990s, the school expanded to include sixth grade, gained accreditation, and expanded its campus facilities.

The Coral Bay School was founded in 2000 and served 13 students in grades 7 through 9. Over the next four years, the school grew to 85 students in grades 7 through 12, gained accreditation, and graduated its first senior class, with 100% college acceptance.

In 2004, the Coral Bay School purchased land on Gifft Hill adjacent to Pine Peace elementary school. That same year, Pine Peace and the Coral Bay School merged to become one, and Gifft Hill School was born.

== Campus expansion and development ==
In 2005, GHS broke ground on a building that would serve as the school’s Upper Campus. In 2009, Glen and Jo Ann Hall donated a four-acre parcel of land adjoining the Lower and Upper Campuses, giving the school a home of 14 contiguous acres. In 2010, the school’s Trayser Field was completed and dedicated to St. John contractor Fred Trayser, who donated eight months of work by his crew to create the field.

== Athletics ==
In 2006, GHS formed its first girls varsity basketball team.

In 2010, a half-court basketball court was built and dedicated as the Nekwan Sprauve Memorial Basketball Court, in honor of a GHS student who died at age 15 due to sickle cell anemia.

In 2018, the GHS elementary basketball team played an undefeated season and won the St. Thomas-St. John Interscholastic Athletic Association championship.

In 2022, the girls middle school volleyball team won the St. Thomas-St. John Interscholastic Athletic Association Volleyball League championship after an undefeated season.

== PBS Visionaries ==
In 2017, Gifft Hill School was featured in November on the 21st season of the PBS Visionaries program, hosted by Sam Waterston and produced by Bill Mosher.

== 2017 hurricane season ==
On September 6, 2017, Hurricane Irma devastated the island of St. John with a direct hit as a Category 5 storm. Less than two weeks later, Category 5 Hurricane Maria passed just south of St. John. Although damage to Gifft Hill School's Upper Campus was too extensive to open to students right away, the school opened the Lower Campus to all grades just five days after Maria impacted the island. The Board of Trustees waived tuition for the 2017-2018 school year and welcomed all students on St. John to attend.

== Eco efforts ==
In 2010, Gifft Hill School initiated a partnership with Iowa State University to form the Education and Resiliency Through Horticulture program, which gives ISU students the opportunity to engage in service learning projects with GHS students.

In 2016, GHS was awarded the EPA Environmental Champion Award in recognition of the school’s commitment to environmental sustainability and for leading by example in the Virgin Islands.

In 2020, GHS was recognized as a Bronze Level Eco-School by the National Wildlife Federation.

== Giving back ==
A commitment to "compassionate community," including community service and giving back, has long been a part of the school's ethos. For many years, the school hosted GHS Gives Back Day, where all students connected with various community organizations for a day of service.

Outside of GHS Gives Back Day, students supported the island's only no-kill animal shelter, the Animal Care Center of St. John, with a fundraising drive, by hosting a bake sale, and by painting a mural on a wall at the organization's new facility.

Students have volunteered for environmental efforts including removing invasive lionfish from St. John waters, and creating hand-painted signage using upcycled materials for the Island Green Living Association's ReSource Depot.

== Notable alumni ==
Alexa Putnam, 2006, competed internationally for the U.S. Virgin Islands in the sport of skeleton.

== General references ==
- "GHS History". giffthillschool.org. St. John: Gift Hill School. Archived from the original on May 22, 2022.
