= Susannaberg, U.S. Virgin Islands =

Coordinates: 18°20′29″N 64°46′22″W

Susannaberg is a neighborhood on the island of Saint John in the United States Virgin Islands. Part of this area is inside Virgin Islands National Park. The island's medical clinic, lumberyard, and several other businesses are located in Susannaberg.

== History ==
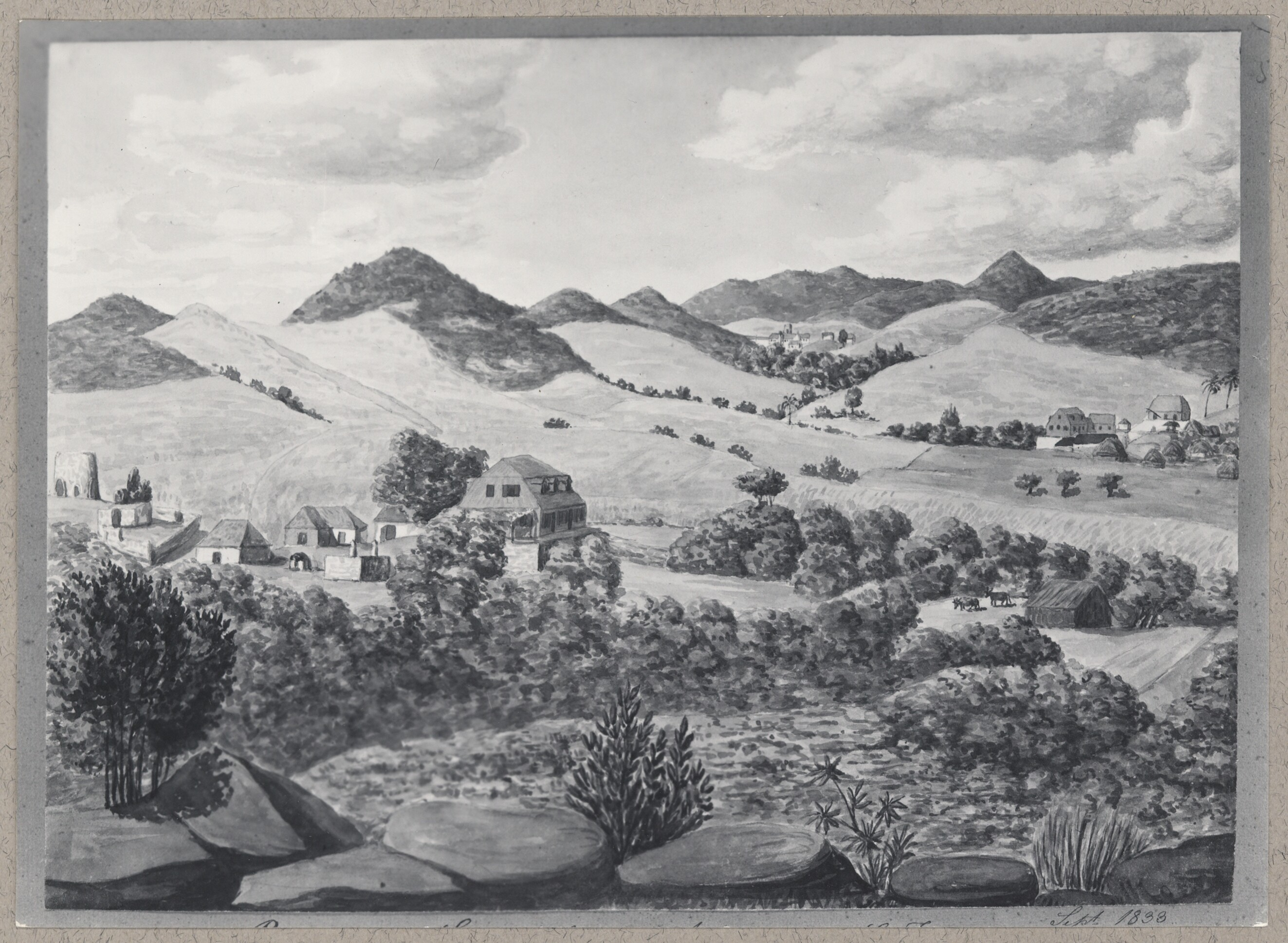
The plantations Susannaberg and Adrian depicted by Frederik von Scholten in 1838.

Susannaberg was during the Danish colonial era the name of a sugar plantation.
