= Breffu =

Akwamu leader of the 1733 slave insurrection on St. John

- Born: Akwamu, Ghana
- Died: April/May 1734; St. Jan, Danish West Indies
- Other names: Baeffu, Beafuu, Beffru
- Military career
- Allegiance: Akwamu Insurrection
- Nickname: Queen of St John

Breffu (possibly derived from Twi, Baffour) was an Akwamu leader of the 1733 slave insurrection on St. John (then known as St. Jan) in Danish West Indies. She killed herself with 23 other rebels to evade capture as the rebellion weakened in 1734.

== St Jan Slave Insurrection ==
Breffu was enslaved at a plantation owned by Pieter Krøyer and lived in Coral Bay. On 23 November 1733, hearing the signal of a cannon fired from Fort Fredericksvaern, Breffu entered the main house and killed both Krøyer and his wife. Taking all gunpowder and ammunition, and accompanied by fellow slave Christian, Breffu then proceeded to the Van Stell family house, where she killed three members of the plantation owner's family.

Some slave masters were able to get off the island on boats and the Akwamu people gained control of most of the territory. Under the leadership of Breffu, the plan of taking over the plantations was successful until the early part of 1734, when the French collaborated with the Danes to take back the island.

She killed herself to evade capture in either April or May 1734. Her body was discovered at Browns Bay, along with another 23 rebels who killed themselves alongside her, at which a plantation owner recorded his surprise that, "one of the leaders of the rebellion, Baeffu, whom none of us knew, and whom we assumed to be a man having murdered my son Pieter Krøyer and his wife, is a woman!"

== In popular culture ==
Breffu has been dramatised as the "Queen of St John" in the play Three Queens Chautauqua Series: Act I Queen Breffu. In a 2006 production, Breffu was portrayed by the academic Jaweh David. She has also featured as a subject in festival floats at St John celebrations.
