= Virgin Islands Coral Reef National Monument =

National monument in the U.S. Virgin Islands

- IUCN category V (protected landscape/seascape)
- Location within the U.S. Virgin Islands Location within the Caribbean
- Interactive map of Virgin Islands Coral Reef National Monument
- Location: Virgin Islands, United States
- Nearest city: St John, VI
- Coordinates: 18°18′22″N 64°43′37″W
- Area: 12,708 acres (51.43 km^{2})
- Authorized: January 17, 2001
- Governing body: National Park Service
- Website: Virgin Islands Coral Reef National Monument

The Virgin Islands Coral Reef National Monument is a U.S. National Monument located off Saint John, Virgin Islands. It is administered by the National Park Service through Virgin Islands National Park, while remaining a distinct unit of the National Park System.

The clear waters surrounding Saint John support a diverse and complex system of coral reefs. The health of these reefs is closely tied to its component plants and animals as well as adjacent non-coral marine environments such as sandy bottoms, seagrass beds, and mangrove forests.

Seeking to provide greater protection to the sensitive coral reef resources, President Clinton established the Virgin Islands Coral Reef National Monument on January 17, 2001. The monument includes 12,708 acres (51 km^{2}) of federal submerged lands within the 3 nautical mile (5 km) belt off Saint John, including Hurricane Hole and areas north and south of Saint John.

== Ecosystem ==
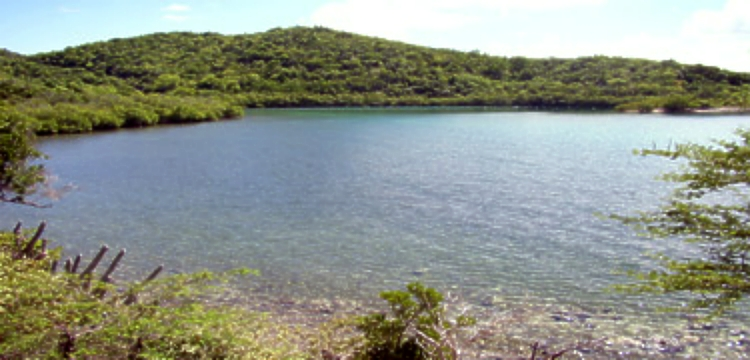
Hurricane Hole, the only coastal part of the National Monument

The coral reefs of the U.S. Virgin Islands suffered severely from coral bleaching in 2005, which led to a 60% decline in coral activity. The USGS began extensive research in the area and scientists discovered previously unknown coral ecosystems at the submerged stems of mangrove trees in the Hurricane Hole area of the National Monument. They found about 30 of the 45 coral species in the Virgin Islands, which is an astonishing diversity for the small area, and were surprised by the number of sponge species as well. This is the first known occurrence of corals in a mangrove ecosystem.

== See also ==
- Virgin Islands National Park
- List of national monuments of the United States
