= The Black Pearl (novel) =

1967 book by Scott O'Dell

- First edition
- Author: Scott O'Dell
- Language: English
- Genre: Young adult novel
- Publisher: Houghton Mifflin Harcourt
- Publication date: 1967
- Publication place: United States
- Media type: Print (hardcover and paperback); audiobook

The Black Pearl is a young adult novel by American author Scott O'Dell. The novel was first published in 1967 and describes the coming of age of the son of a pearl dealer.

== Plot summary ==
Ramon Salazar finds a black pearl so beautiful that his father is certain Ramon has found the fabled Pearl of Heaven. This find will bring renown to their town, and to the Salazar name. However, the pearl also has a curse that haunts the town and Salazar's family.

== Film adaptation ==
Royal Productions and Universum Film produced a film adaptation of The Black Pearl. Released in 1977, the film was directed by Saul Swimmer, written by Victor Miller, and featured performances by Gilbert Roland, Mario Custodio, and Carl Anderson. Perla Cristal and Emilio Rodríguez also starred in the film.

Initially, The Black Pearl was to be shot in Mexico with Ben Vereen in the lead role. But the movie was eventually filmed in Spain without Vereen.

== See also ==
- Herman Melville: Moby-Dick (1851)
- John Steinbeck: The Pearl (1947) (also set among the pearl divers of La Paz)
- Ernest Hemingway: The Old Man and the Sea (1952) (aging Cuban fisherman struggling with a giant marlin)
- Peter Benchley: The Girl of the Sea of Cortez (1982)
