= My Name Is Not Angelica =

1989 young adult novel by Scott O'Dell

- First edition
- Author: Scott O’Dell
- Genre: Historical
- Publisher: Houghton Mifflin
- Publication date: 1989
- Pages: 130
- ISBN: 978-039551061-2

My Name is Not Angelica is a 1989 young adult novel by Scott O’Dell. This historical fiction takes place during the 1733 slave insurrection on St. John Island, then a colony of Denmark.

This was the last novel written by Scott O’Dell, an award-winning writer of children’s historical fiction. It was published after his death at age 91 in 1989.

== Plot ==
The book tells the story of slavery in the Danish West Indies through the eyes of Raisha, renamed "Angelica" by her new masters. Betrayed by a rival tribe and shipped to the Caribbean, Raisha, her betrothed Konje and her friend Dondo are bought by Dutch family Jost Van Prok. Conditions on the island for the slaves were harsh. They suffered starvation, dehydration, forced labor and cruel punishments. In 1733 a portion of the slaves ran away to Mary Island where they planned their widescale revolt, which lasted until mid-1734.

== Reception ==
The novel received favorable reviews from Kirkus Reviews and Book Trends.
