= Sing Down the Moon =

1970 book by Scott O'Dell

- First edition
- Author: Scott O'Dell
- Language: English
- Genre: Children's literature Classics Historical Fiction
- Publisher: Houghton Mifflin
- Publication date: 1970
- Publication place: United States
- Media type: Print
- Pages: 124 pp
- ISBN: 9780545356398

Sing Down the Moon is a children's literature book written by author Scott O'Dell. It was published in 1970 by Houghton Mifflin. The book received several major awards, beginning with recognition as a Newbery Medal Honor Book, 1971, followed by selection as a Booklist Contemporary Classics for Young Adults, 1984 and Phoenix Award Honor Book, 1990 (Children's Literature Association).

== Plot ==
Bright Morning is a young girl who is part of the Navajo tribe. As a Navajo woman, her mother was the owner of a large flock of sheep since shepherding is part of the Navajo way of life. With her black dog in tow, Bright Morning takes the flock to the High Mesas so they can feed on new grass. Her friends White Deer and Running Bird always join her.

One day, Bright Morning and her friend Running Bird are caught by men who they later realize are Spaniards. The leader of the Spaniards, "the one with white teeth", as Bright Morning describes him, is a slave catcher that has made a deal with a Señora in a small town. The Señora has a 12-year old maid named Rosita, who was also brought by the leader of the Spaniards. Running Bird and Bright Morning are sold separately.

Although the Señora treats her kindly, Bright Morning is miserable and plans to escape. One day, Rosita and Bright Morning go to town for an Easter Celebration. Here she meets Nehana, an Indian girl who is part of the Nez Perce tribe. Nehana tells Bright Morning where Running Bird is and that they will escape soon. Later, Bright Morning, Nehana, and Running Bird attempt their plan. However, the Spaniards catch up. Luckily, Bright Morning's future husband Tall Boy is there with Mando and his men. After a fight against the Spaniards, Tall Boy is shot and the leader of the Spaniards is killed. When they reach home, the "Long Knives" Americans are claiming the land. They threaten the Navajo and force them to leave Canyon De Chelly. The tribe leaves their home and members slowly started dying because of the hazardous conditions.

Follow along as Bright Morning cares for the permanently injured Tall Boy, and their son.

== Reception ==
Many critics agree that "Sing Down the Moon" is beautifully written with simplicity and intensity, making it book of the year claimed by The New York Times. The Horn Book said that the book is the depiction of the triumph of the human spirit. The Bulletin of the Center for Children's Books wrote "The very simplicity of O'Dell's writing, at times almost terse, makes more vivid the tragedy of the eviction and the danger and triumph of the return". Book World- The Washington Post also acknowledges the beautiful writing and adds that it is immensely moving and is a memorable reading experience for any age. Shirley Nelson, a reviewer for children's literature, called this short novel a heart-wrenching story of the Long Walk of 1863 through 1865, seen through the eyes of the young Navajo woman, Bright Morning.

== See also ==
- 1970 in literature
