= Scott O'Dell =

American writer (1898–1989)

- Born: O'Dell Gabriel Scott; May 23, 1898; Los Angeles, California, U.S.
- Died: October 15, 1989 (aged 91); Mount Kisco, New York, U.S.
- Resting place: Cremation
- Occupation: Writer
- Spouses: Jane Dorsa Rattenbury O'Dell (m. 1948, d. 1989); Elizabeth Hall
- Writing career
- Period: 1934–1989
- Genre: Children's historical fiction
- Notable works: Island of the Blue Dolphins (1960); The Black Pearl (1967)
- Notable awards: Newbery Medal; 1961; Hans Christian Andersen Award; 1972
- Website: www.scottodell.com

Scott O'Dell (May 23, 1898 – October 15, 1989) was an American writer of 26 novels for young people, along with three novels for adults and four nonfiction books. He wrote historical fiction, primarily, including several children's novels about historical California and Mexico. For his contribution as a children's writer he received the biennial, international Hans Christian Andersen Award in 1972, the highest recognition available to creators of children's books. He received The University of Southern Mississippi Medallion in 1976 and the Catholic Libraries Association Regina Medal in 1978.

O'Dell's best known work is the historical novel Island of the Blue Dolphins (1960), which won the 1961 Newbery Medal and the 1963 Deutscher Jugendliteraturpreis in its German translation. It was also named to the Lewis Carroll Shelf Award list. He was one of the annual Newbery runners-up for three other books: The King's Fifth (1966), The Black Pearl (1967), and Sing Down the Moon (1970).

== Biography ==
Scott O'Dell was born on May 23, 1898, as "O'Dell Gabriel Scott", but after his name was incorrectly published on a book as "Scott O'Dell", he decided to keep the name. He was born on Terminal Island in Los Angeles, California, to parents May Elizabeth Gabriel and Bennett Mason Scott. He attended multiple colleges, including Occidental College in 1919, the University of Wisconsin–Madison in 1920, Stanford University in 1921, and the Sapienza University of Rome in 1925. During World War II, he served in the United States Army Air Forces. Before becoming a full-time writer, he was employed as a cameraman and technical director, as a book columnist for the Los Angeles Mirror, and as book review editor for the Los Angeles Daily News. He was married two times. His wives were Jane Dorsa Rattenbury, and Elizabeth Hall.

In 1934, O'Dell began writing articles as well as fiction and nonfiction books for adults. In the late 1950s, he began writing children's books. His first children's book was Island of the Blue Dolphins.

In the 1950s, O'Dell lived in the gold rush mountain town of Julian, California, east of San Diego, where he said he found quiet and motivation to write.

In 1984, he established the Scott O'Dell Award for Historical Fiction, an award of $5,000 that recognizes outstanding works of historical fiction. The winners must be published in English by a U.S. publisher and be set in the New World (North, Central, and South America). In 1986, The Bulletin of the Center for Children's Books awarded O'Dell this same award.

Scott O'Dell died of prostate cancer on October 15, 1989, at the age of 91. His ashes were sprinkled into the Pacific Ocean off La Jolla.

== Film adaptations ==
There have been several film adaptations of O'Dell's work. Island of the Blue Dolphins has been translated into a number of languages and was made into a movie in 1964, starring Celia Kaye, Larry Domasin, Ann Daniel, and George Kennedy. In 1978, Saul Swimmer produced and directed a film version of The Black Pearl with Gilbert Roland and Mario Custodio. The King's Fifth served as inspiration for the 1982 anime television series The Mysterious Cities of Gold, a Japan-France co-production that was aired in several different countries.

== Selected works ==
=== Nonfiction ===
- Representative Photoplays Analyzed, Palmer Institute of Authorship 1/1924
- Country of the Sun (Southern California, an Informal Guide), Thomas Y. Crowell Co. 1/1957

=== Children's book series ===
Karana

1. Island of the Blue Dolphins, Houghton Mifflin 1/1960, ISBN 0-605-21314-3
2. Zia, Houghton Mifflin 3/1976, ISBN 0-395-24393-9

Seven Serpents

1. The Captive, Houghton Mifflin 1/1979, ISBN 0-395-27811-2
2. Feathered Serpent, Houghton Mifflin 10/1981, ISBN 0-395-30851-8
3. The Amethyst Ring, Houghton Mifflin 4/1983, ISBN 0-395-33886-7
- omnibus Seven Serpents Trilogy, Sourcebooks Jabberwocky 3/2009, ISBN 1-4022-1836-2

=== Other novels ===
- Woman of Spain (a Story of Old California), Houghton Mifflin 1934
- Hill of the Hawk (Novel of Early California), Houghton Mifflin 1/1947
  - latest edition: Kessinger Publishing 9/2010, ISBN 978-1-163-37182-4
- The Sea is Red, Henry Holt and Company 1958
- Journey to Jericho, Houghton Mifflin 8/1964, ISBN 978-0-395-19839-1
- The King's Fifth, Houghton Mifflin 9/1966, ISBN 0-395-06963-7
- The Black Pearl, Houghton Mifflin 1/1967, ISBN 0-395-06963-7
- Dark Canoe, illustrated by Milton Johnson, Houghton Mifflin 1/1968
  - latest edition: Sourcebooks Jabberwocky 9/2008, ISBN 1-4022-1334-4
- Sing Down the Moon, Houghton Mifflin 9/1970, ISBN 0-395-10919-1
- Treasure of Topo-El-Bampo, Houghton Mifflin 2/1972, ISBN 0-395-12576-6
- Cruise of the Arctic Star, Houghton Mifflin 3/1973, ISBN 0-395-16034-0
- The Child of Fire, Houghton Mifflin 9/1974, ISBN 0-395-19496-2
- The Hawk That Dare Not Hunt by Day, Houghton Mifflin 9/1975,
- The 290, Houghton Mifflin 10/1976, ISBN 0-395-24737-3
- Carlota, Houghton Mifflin 10/1977, ISBN 0-395-25487-6
- Kathleen Please Come Home, Houghton Mifflin 5/1978, ISBN 0-395-26453-7
- Daughter of Don Saturnino, Oxford University Press 3/1979, ISBN 0-19-271429-5
- Sarah Bishop (They Took Away Her Home and Her Family), Houghton Mifflin 1/1980
  - latest edition: San Val 10/1999, ISBN 0-8085-5778-5
- The Spanish Smile, Houghton Mifflin 10/1982, ISBN 0-395-32867-5
- Castle in the Sea, Houghton Mifflin 10/1983, ISBN 0-395-34831-5
- Alexandra, Houghton Mifflin 4/1984, ISBN 0-395-35571-0
- The Road to Damietta, Houghton Mifflin 10/1985, ISBN 0-395-38923-2
- Streams to River, River to the Sea (a Novel of Sacagawea), Houghton Mifflin 4/1986, ISBN 0-395-40430-4
- The Serpent Never Sleeps (a Novel of Jamestown and Pocahontas), Houghton Mifflin 9/1987, ISBN 978-0547561998
- Black Star, Bright Dawn, Houghton Mifflin 1/1988
  - latest edition: Graphia 3/2008, ISBN 0-547-05319-3
- My Name Is Not Angelica, Houghton Mifflin 10/1989, ISBN 0-395-51061-9
- Thunder Rolling in the Mountains, with Elizabeth Hall, Houghton Mifflin 4/1992, ISBN 978-0-395-59966-2
- Venus Among the Fishes, with Elizabeth Hall, Houghton Mifflin 4/1995, ISBN 978-0-395-70561-2
