= Myrah Keating Smith =

US Virgin Islands nurse and midwife

- Born: Myrah Athenia Keating; June 1, 1908; Saint Thomas, Danish West Indies
- Died: May 4, 1994 (aged 85); Saint John, U.S. Virgin Islands
- Occupation: nurse
- Years active: 1931-1980s

Myrah Keating Smith (June 1, 1908 – May 4, 1994) was a pioneering nurse and midwife on the island of Saint John, U.S. Virgin Islands. For almost two decades, she was the only provider of health care on St. John. In 1983, the Myrah Keating Smith Community Health Center was named in her honor and in 2005, she was inducted into the Virgin Islands Women's Hall of Fame.

== Early life ==
Myrah Athenia Keating was born as a twin with her sister Andromeada, on June 1, 1908, on the island of Saint Thomas in the Danish West Indies to Eugenia Theodora and Zephaniah Keating. She and her sister were raised in Lovanto Cay, on Saint John by her mother and step-father, Edward Moorehead, Sr. They first attended a school organized in the parlor of the home of Mrs. Anderson and taught by Sylvanie Sewer. There were only eighteen students who enrolled and when the teacher found it difficult to commute from Cruz Bay, the school was closed and the twins were taught at home by their stepfather. At the age of fourteen, Keating traveled to New York City by boat, and then via train for three more days to continue her education at the Tuskegee Institute in Alabama. She studied handicrafts and tailoring at Tuskegee and then continued her schooling at the institute's hospital, known as the John Albion Andrew Memorial Hospital, where she studied nursing. She was the only student from the Virgin Islands in her surgical nursing class, and graduated with a degree in nursing and midwifery.

== Career ==
Returning to the Virgin Islands in 1931, Keating began work in St. Thomas, under the tutelage of Knud Hansen. After a two-year orientation program, she returned to St. John. There were no other medical practitioners on the island for the first two decades of her service. Because there were no paved roads, public transportation, or electricity, she traveled by boat, horse or foot to serve as a public nurse, school nurse and midwife, delivering over 500 babies throughout her career. She also raised three daughters, Andromeada, Emily and Myrah with her husband Allan Franklin Smith. In 1983, the Myrah Keating Smith Community Health Center of St. John was named in her honor. It celebrated thirty years of service in 2013. In addition, the first ambulance boat in St. John was named after her, as was a 4-year scholarship in nursing, funded by the government.

== Death and legacy ==
Smith died on May 4, 1994, in St. John. Posthumously, she was inducted into the Virgin Islands Women's Hall of Fame in 2005.
