= Saint John, U.S. Virgin Islands =

One of the main islands of the United States Virgin Islands

Saint John
Nickname: Love City
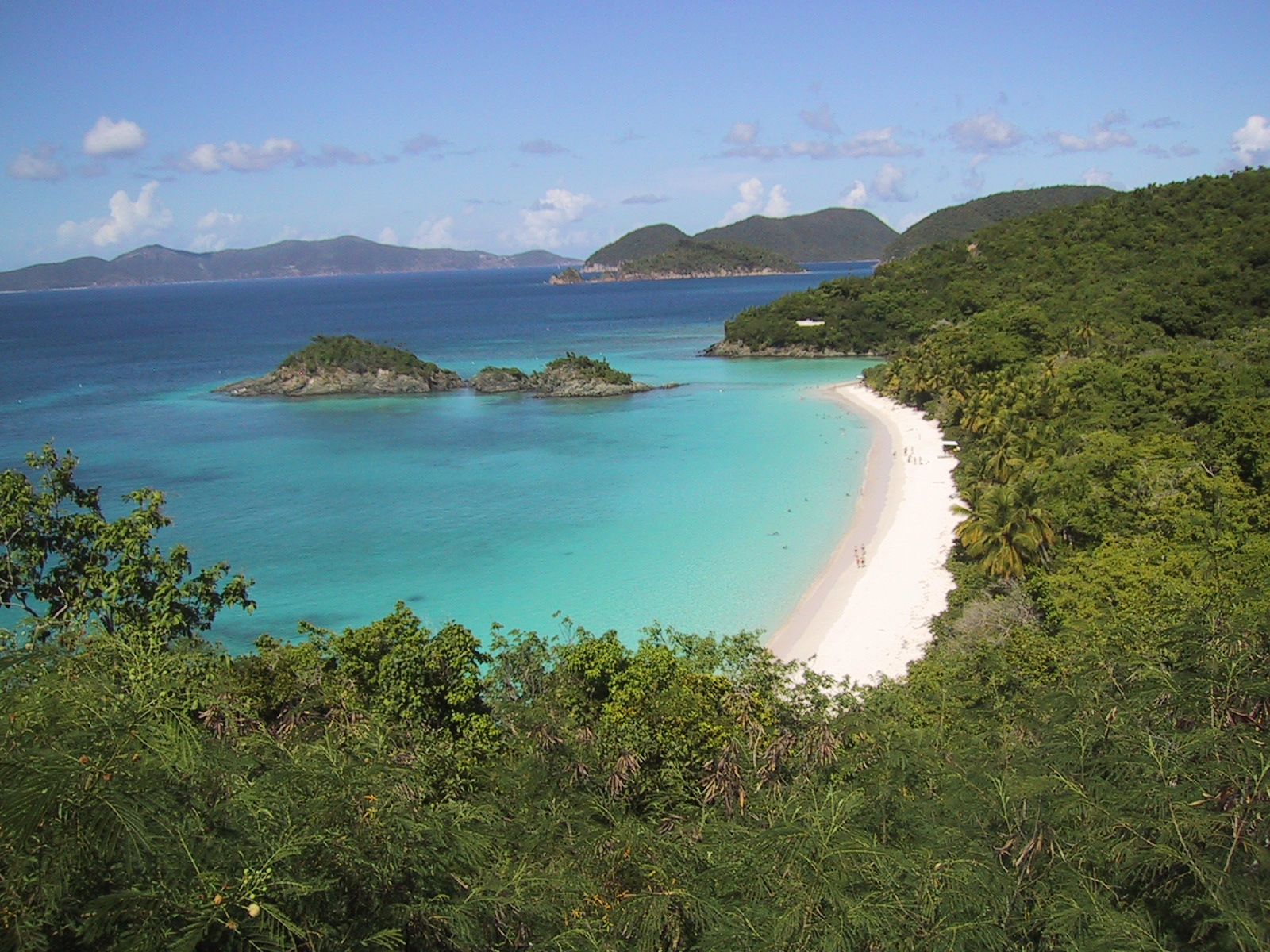
- Trunk Bay, Saint John, U.S. Virgin Islands

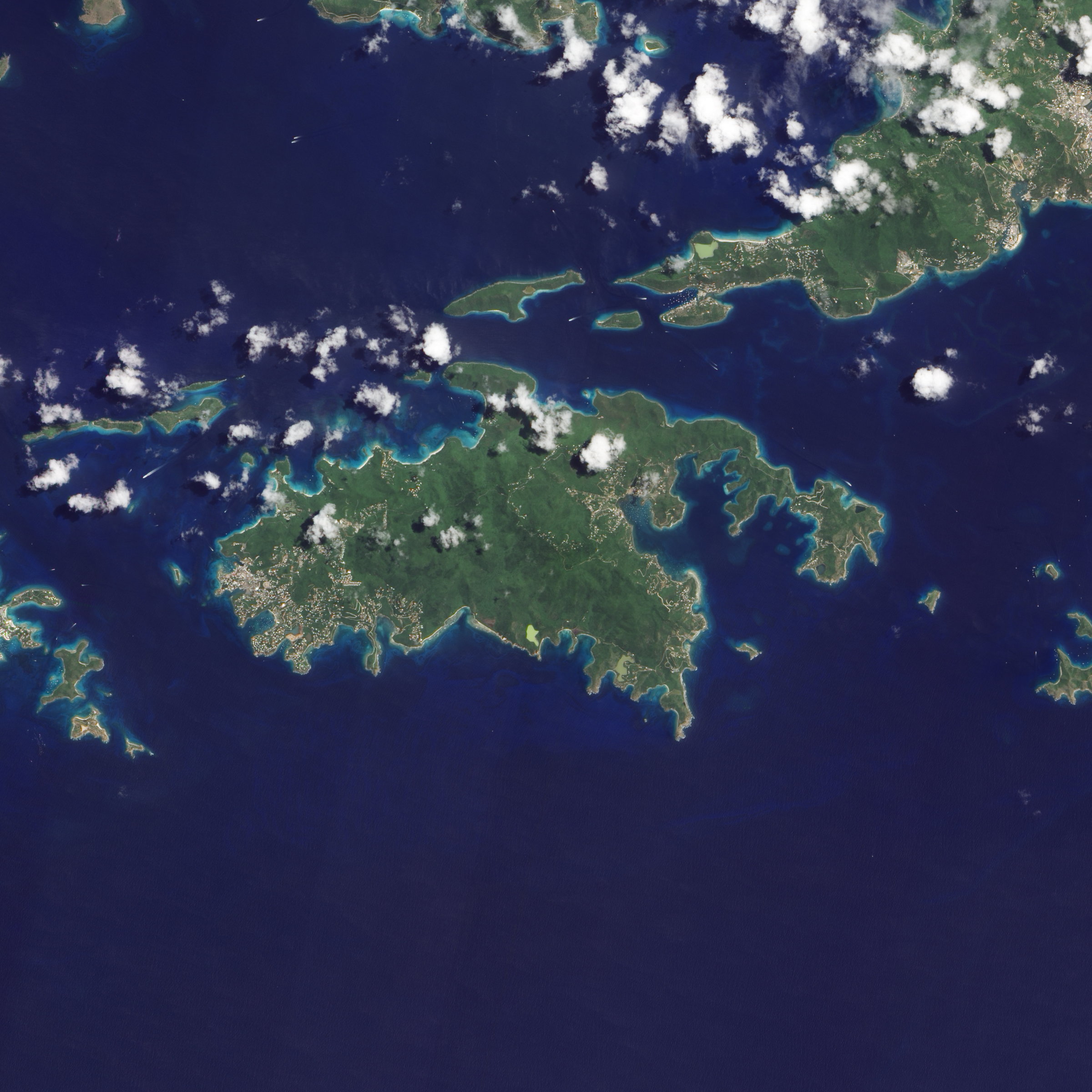
- Satellite image of Saint John

- Location within the U.S. Virgin Islands Location within Lesser Antilles Location within the Caribbean

Geography
- Location: Caribbean Sea
- Coordinates: 18°20′N 64°44′W
- Archipelago: Virgin Islands, Leeward Islands
- Area: 20 sq mi (52 km^{2})

Administration
- United States
- Insular area: United States Virgin Islands
- District: Saint Thomas-Saint John
- Largest settlement: Cruz Bay (pop. 2,706)
- Administrator: Shikima Jones

Demographics
- Population: 3,881 (2020 census)
- Pop. density: 74.6/km^{2} (193.2/sq mi)

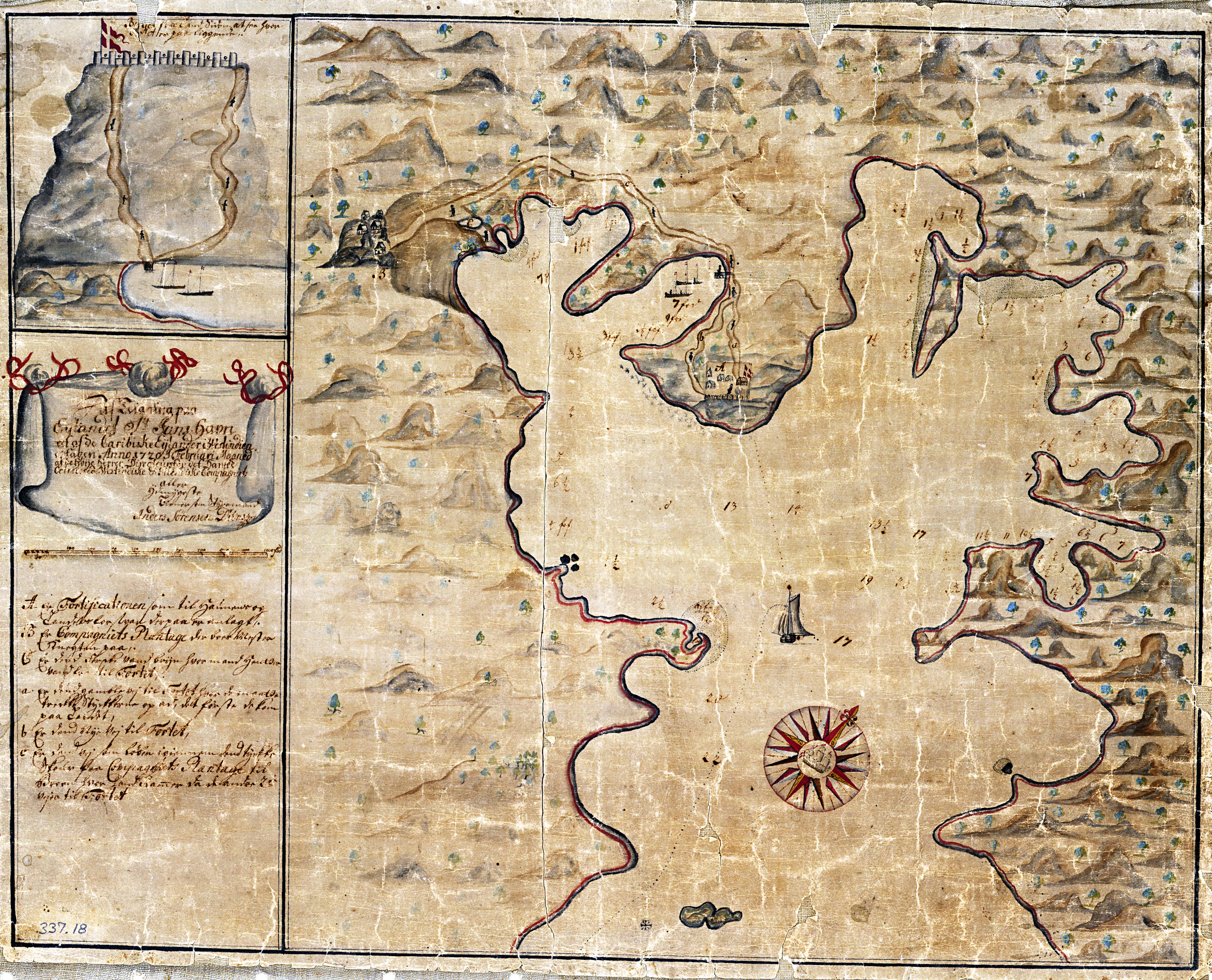
Coral Bay, Sankt Jan; map from 1720

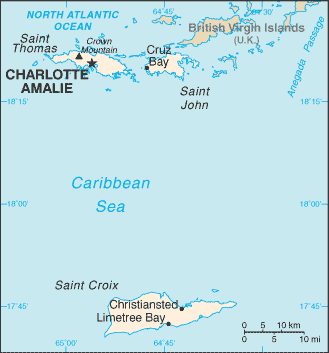
Map of the U.S. Virgin Islands

Saint John (Danish: Sankt Jan; Spanish: San Juan) is one of the Virgin Islands in the Caribbean Sea and a constituent district of the United States Virgin Islands (USVI), an unincorporated territory of the United States.

Saint John (50 km^{2} (19 sq mi)) is the smallest of the three main US Virgin Islands. It is located about four miles east of Saint Thomas, the location of the territory's capital, Charlotte Amalie. It is also four miles southwest of Tortola, part of the British Virgin Islands. Its largest settlement is Cruz Bay with a population of 2,652. Saint John's nickname is Love City.

Since 1956, approximately 60% of the island is protected as Virgin Islands National Park, administered by the United States National Park Service. The economy is based predominantly on tourism and related trade.

Saint John is 50.8 km^{2} (19.6 sq mi) in area with a population of 3,881 (2020 census). As of the 2020 U.S. census, the population of the US Virgin Islands territory was 87,146, comprising mostly persons of Afro-Caribbean descent.

== History ==
Petroglyphs and artifacts found at Cinnamon Bay indicate a Taíno presence on Saint John from about 700 to the late 15th century.

Christopher Columbus sailed past Saint John on his second voyage in 1493, but did not come ashore. He named the northern Virgin Islands Las Once Mil Virgenes.

=== Colonization and settlement ===
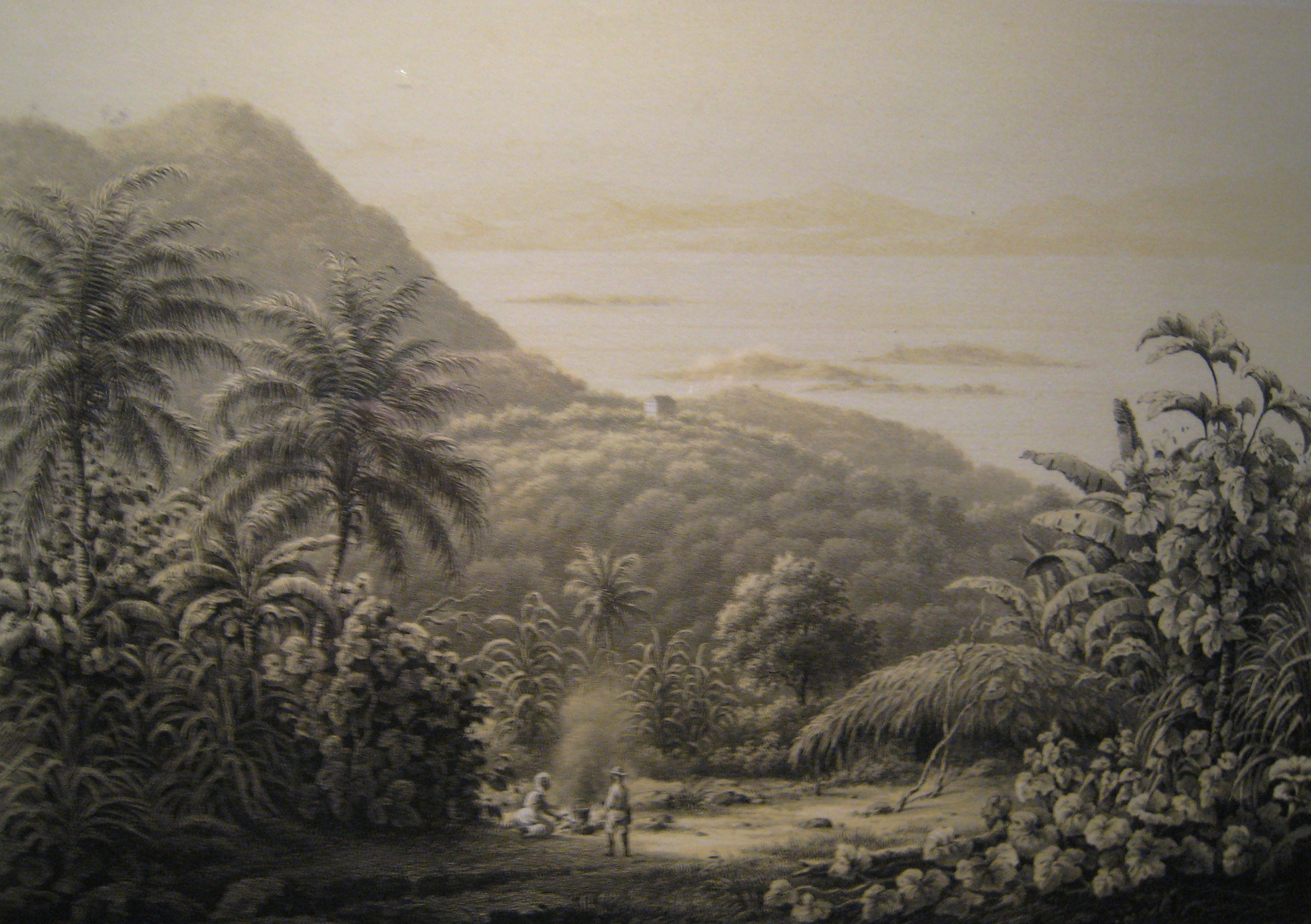
Lithograph of Sankt Jan, 1850

The Danish West India Company resettled Saint Thomas in 1671, and an African slave market was established in 1673. Saint John was claimed as a part of the British Leeward Islands in 1684 when it was leased to two English merchants from Barbados, yet they were removed by Governor Stapleton. It was uninhabited when 20 Danish planters came over from Saint Thomas in 1717, and the island was claimed again by Denmark in 1718. They grew sugar cane, cotton, and other crops. Annaberg sugar plantation was built in 1731, and became one of the island's largest sugar producers by the 19th century. By 1733, there were 109 plantations on the island, 21 of which were producing sugar. The islands were made a crown colony in 1754, and the British relinquished their claims to the island to the Danish in 1762.

The 1733 slave insurrection on St. John started when a small group of slaves entered Fort Frederiksvaern, on Fortsberg Hill in Coral Bay, with cane bills concealed within bundles of wood. The slaves, led by those formerly from Akwamu, overpowered and killed 5 of the 6 soldiers within the Danish fort. Firing the fort's cannon, the signal was given for the start of a six-month revolt, which only ended when French troops were brought in from Martinique.

Instead of submitting to captivity and slavery, more than a dozen men and women, including Breffu, one of the leaders, shot and killed themselves before the French forces reached them.

Moravian Brethren built the first church at Emmaus in 1749. Cruz Bay was established in 1766, and includes The Battery.

By 1804, the slave population reached a peak of 2,604. Denmark emancipated the slaves in 1848, and by 1850, many of the plantations were abandoned. By 1901, Saint John's population was 925, and the last sugar factory ceased operation in 1908. Between 1845 and 1945, the population declined by 70%.

=== Purchase ===
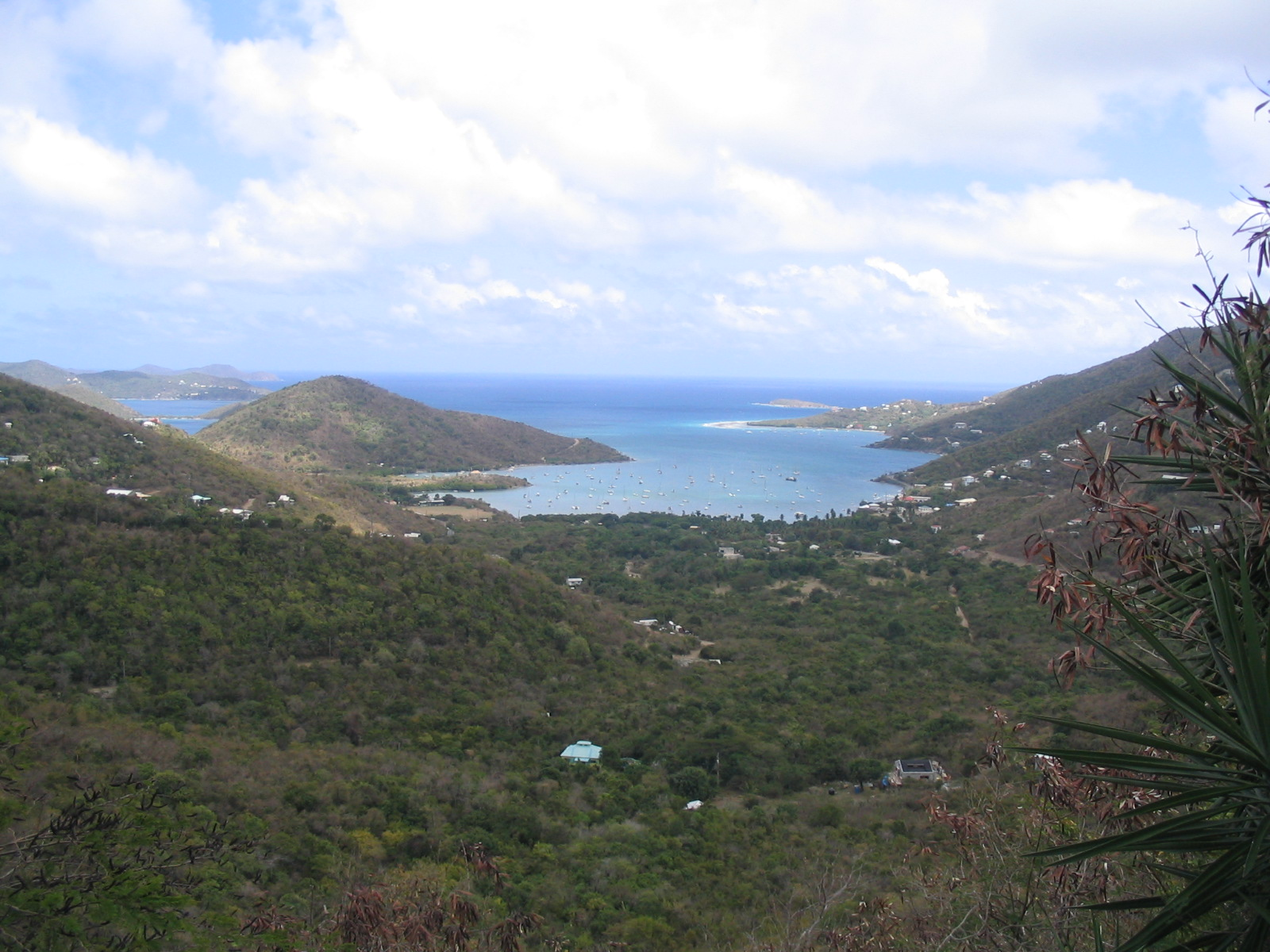
Coral Bay, Saint John

In 1917, during the First World War, the United States purchased the U.S. Virgin Islands for $25 million from the Danish government in order to establish a naval base. It was intended to prevent expansion of the German Empire into the Western Hemisphere. As part of the negotiations for this deal, the US agreed to recognize Denmark's claim to Greenland, which they had previously disputed.

During the 20th century, private investors acquired properties on the island, redeveloping some plantation houses as vacation resorts, such as Laurence Rockefeller's Caneel Bay Resort. The islands became popular and tourism and related service jobs developed as a major part of the economy.

=== Hurricane Irma ===
In September 2017, Saint John was hit by Hurricane Irma. The category 5 storm forced roughly half of the island's 4,500 residents to evacuate and caused power outages that lasted for months.

== Government ==
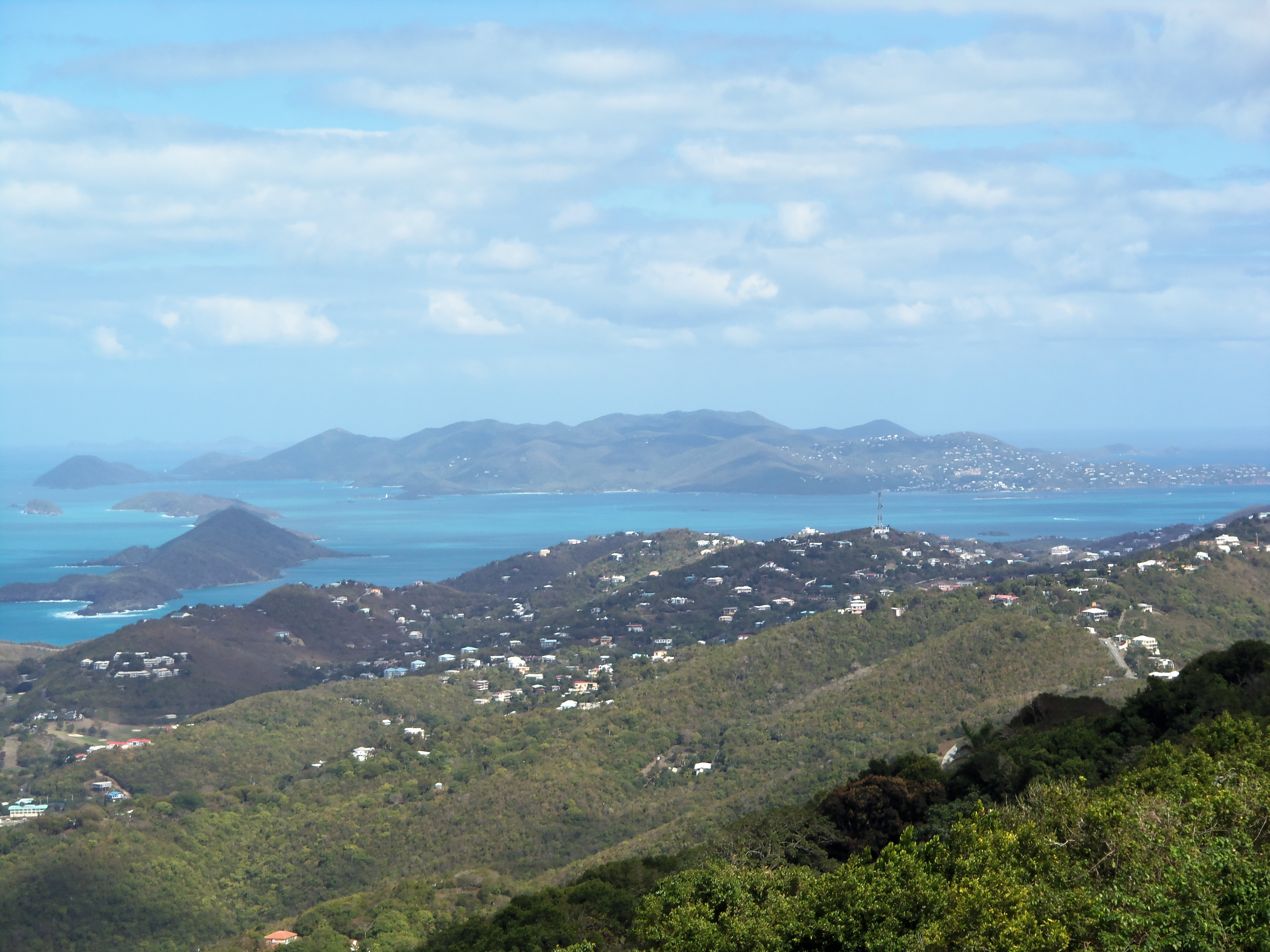
View of Saint John from neighboring Saint Thomas

Since 1917, the U.S. Virgin Islands are an organized, unincorporated territory of the United States. Its residents are U.S. citizens, but they cannot vote in presidential elections.

Until 1970, governors of the territory were appointed by the US president. Since that year, residents of the island have elected a territorial governor and lieutenant governor, and fifteen senators to the legislature, representing all three islands. Seven are elected from the district of Saint Croix, seven from the district of Saint Thomas and Saint John, and one senator at-large (who must be a resident of Saint John) are elected for two-year terms to the unicameral Virgin Islands Legislature.

Residents of the Virgin Islands also elect a delegate to the US Congress, who has non-voting status in that body.

Saint John has no local government; however, the Governor appoints an administrator for the island. Having no official powers, this figure acts more as an advisor to the Governor and as a spokesperson for the Governor's policies.

The main political parties in the U.S. Virgin Islands are the Democratic Party of the Virgin Islands, the Independent Citizens Movement (ICM), and the Republican Party of the Virgin Islands. Additional candidates run as independents.

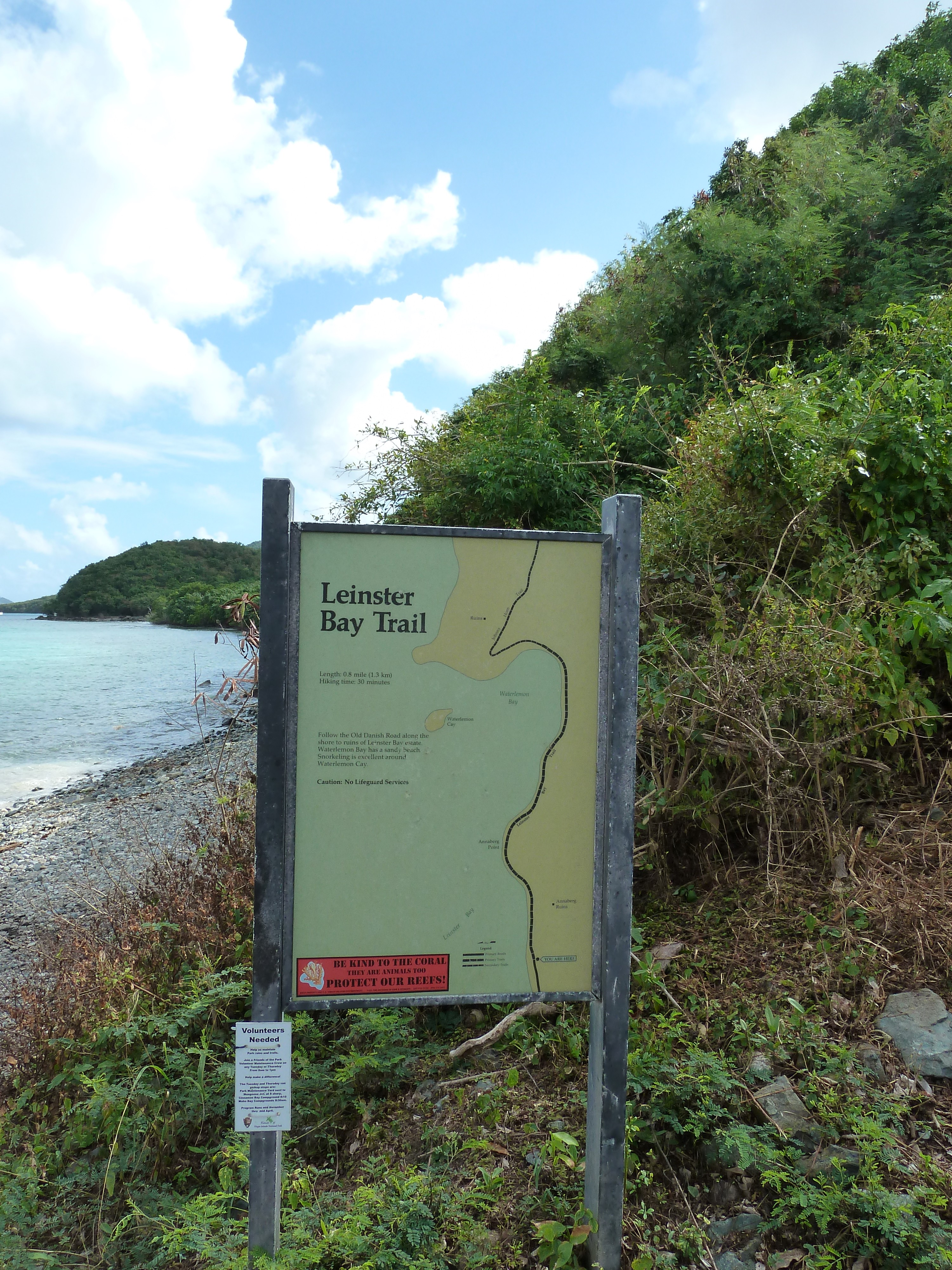
Leinster Bay Trail Map of Saint John's National Park

=== Voting ===
Districts and subdistricts of the US Virgin Islands

Saint John is divided into the following subdistricts (with population as per the 2020 U.S. census):

1. Central (pop. 470)
2. Coral Bay (pop. 724)
3. Cruz Bay (pop. 2,652)
4. East End (pop. 35)

Activists filed a lawsuit on September 20, 2011 in the federal US District Court of the Virgin Islands seeking the right to be represented in Congress and to vote for U.S. president. The case is Civil No. 3:11-cv-110, Charles v. U.S. Federal Elections Commission et al. The case alleges the 1917 Congress, with all-white members, denied the right to vote to island residents due to racial discrimination, as the island had a majority of people of color. The case was dismissed on August 20, 2012.

== Economy ==
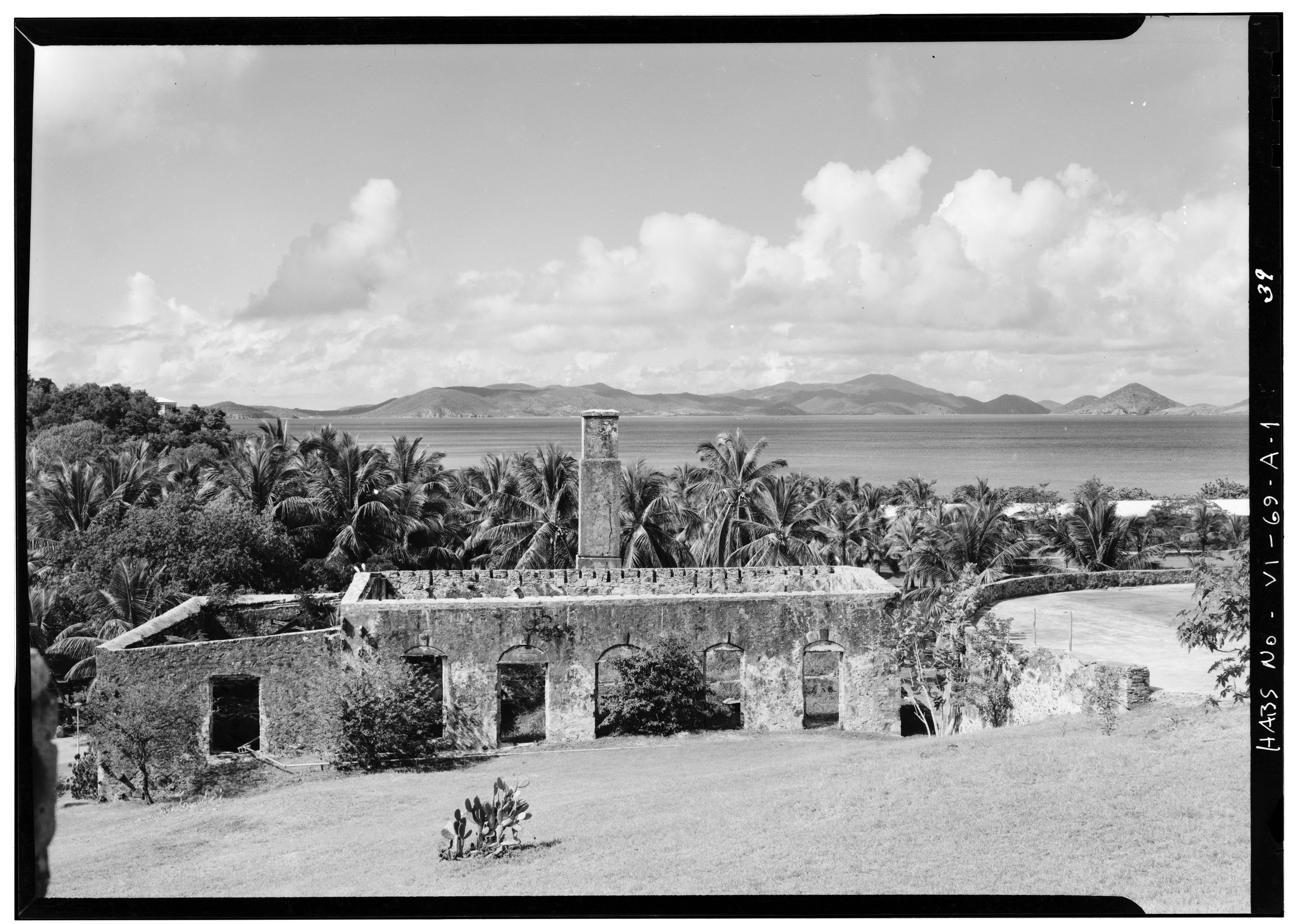
Sugar cane factory ruins

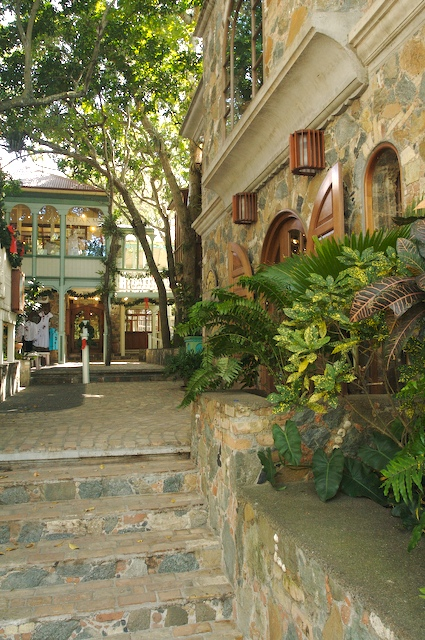
Entrance to Mongoose Junction, a popular shopping center in Cruz Bay, U.S. Virgin Islands.

The main export of Saint John used to be sugar cane, which was produced in great quantity using African slave labor. However, this industry declined after the abolition of slavery, as it was dependent on slave labor to be profitable. In addition, in that period, it had to compete with sugar produced in other areas, including by the use of sugar beets in northern locations.

=== Tourism ===
The economy of Saint John is almost entirely dependent on tourism. The island has hundreds of rental villas as well as hotels and resorts. Numerous shops and restaurants serving both residents and tourists are located in Cruz Bay and Coral Bay.

Saint John is a popular stop for day and term boat charters from the United States Virgin Islands, Puerto Rico, and the British Virgin Islands. Individual and group boat charters are widely available on Saint John and island hopping is a favorite local and visitor activity. Popular day excursions include bar hopping or snorkeling at Christmas Cove, Jost Van Dyke, Buck Island National Wildlife Refuge, Tortola, Norman Island, Virgin Gorda, Water Island, Lovongo Cay, Cooper Island, and Peter Island. Mooring and anchoring locations are available in most bays around Saint John for both day use and overnight stays.

==== Virgin Islands National Park ====
In 1956, Laurance Rockefeller donated his extensive lands on the island to the United States' National Park Service, under the condition that the lands had to be protected from future development. The remaining portion, the Caneel Bay Resort, operates on a lease arrangement with the NPS, which owns the underlying land.

The boundaries of the Virgin Islands National Park include 75% of the island, but various in-holdings within the park boundary (e.g., Peter Bay) reduce the park lands to 60% of the island acreage.

Much of the island's waters, coral reefs, and shoreline have been protected by being included in the national park. This protection was expanded in 2001, when the Virgin Islands Coral Reef National Monument was created.

=== Transport ===
While Saint John does not have an airport, the island is served by Cyril E. King Airport on nearby Saint Thomas. There used to be a seaplane base in the town of Cruz Bay. Antilles Airboats provided regular service until it was sold by Maureen O'Hara. The Virgin Islands Seaplane Shuttle also used to offer services to that seaplane base using Grumman Mallards prior to Hurricane Hugo.

A ferry service runs hourly from Red Hook, Saint Thomas, thrice daily from Charlotte Amalie, Saint Thomas, and daily from Tortola; regular ferries also operate from Virgin Gorda, Jost Van Dyke and Anegada.

Cars and cargo are transported to the island via barge. Two companies offer barge service between Red Hook, Saint Thomas and Cruz Bay, Saint John. The barges operate hourly during daylight hours. Although prohibited by Virgin Islands law, some rental car companies allow their vehicles to use the car ferry. This is because the U.S. District Court deemed the law to violate the Interstate Commerce Clause of the United States Constitution. However, as of 2017, the unconstitutional law is still technically on the books, but the Government of the Virgin Islands does not enforce it. Car rental companies are located throughout Cruz Bay, most within easy walking distance of the ferry dock.

Taxis are widely available on Saint John to provide transport to beaches, hotels, and vacation villas. Water taxi service is also available from Dolphin Water Taxi.

VITRAN public bus service runs hourly on weekdays between Cruz Bay and Salt Pond Bay via Centerline Road.

==== Major port town ====
In the colonial era, Coral Bay was the hub of economic activity on the island. Its natural port offered protection to the sailing ships of the day. In addition, it was an easy sail by smaller boats, with minimal tacking, to the nearby British Virgin Islands. Until the late 20th century, the residents of Coral Bay and East End had easier and more frequent access to Tortola than did those of either Cruz Bay or Saint Thomas.

Today, Cruz Bay is the port of entry to Saint John. Cargo and car barges use The Theovald Eric Moorehead Dock and Terminal. Domestic ferries use the Loredon L Boynes Dock in central Cruz Bay. International ferries use the United States Customs and Immigration dock at the Victor William Sewer Marine Facility.

Cruise ships visit Cruz Bay regularly during the winter, although they must anchor and deliver guests via tender. Saint John is also a popular day excursion for cruise ship passengers at port in Saint Thomas or Tortola.

The waters surrounding the US Virgin Islands are patrolled by United States Coast Guard cutters out of Miami, Florida, and San Juan, Puerto Rico.

== Notable people ==
- Breffu, an Akwamu leader of the 1733 slave insurrection on St. John
- Myrah Keating Smith (1908–1994), a pioneering nurse and midwife
- John Campbell (born 1962), and daughter Jasmine Campbell (born 1991), alpine skiers, moved to US in 2000
- J. Robert Oppenheimer, the 'Godfather of the Atomic Bomb', starting in 1954, Oppenheimer lived for several months of each year on the island. From 1957 onwards, he owned a home on Gibney Beach.

== Education ==
St. Thomas-St. John School District operates schools for the island residents. Saint John has one public school, Julius E. Sprauve (pronounced "Sprow" and referred to as 'JESS'). Private and parochial schools include Gifft Hill School (formerly Pine Peace and Coral Bay), Saint John Christian Academy, Saint John Methodist School, and the Saint John Montessori School.

The only school that includes a high school is Gifft Hill, along with their programs in elementary and middle school. The only other middle school on the island is the 'JESS,' which also has an elementary program. The public high school for Saint John students is Ivanna Eudora Kean High School located in Red Hook, Saint Thomas.

In October, 2020, the Trump administration signed a non-binding preliminary agreement to pursue a land swap between the National Park Service and the U.S. Virgin Islands. The U.S. Department of the Interior (DOI) and Government of the Virgin Islands (GVI) agreed to work together for 12 months to evaluate a proposed exchange that, if successful, would allow local officials to construct the first K-12 public school on Saint John. Public education on Saint John is currently only available through the eighth grade. The National Park Service issued a Finding of No Significant Impact (FONSI) on the Environmental Assessment (EA) for the potential land exchange. The final 45-day public comment period on the land exchange was opened from January 8, 2023 until Feb. 21, 2023.

== In literature ==
- Grandma Raised the Roof by Ethel Walbridge McCully. Author's own story of building her dream home on Saint John and defending it from being acquired by the National Park Service, in the early 1950s.

== Gallery ==
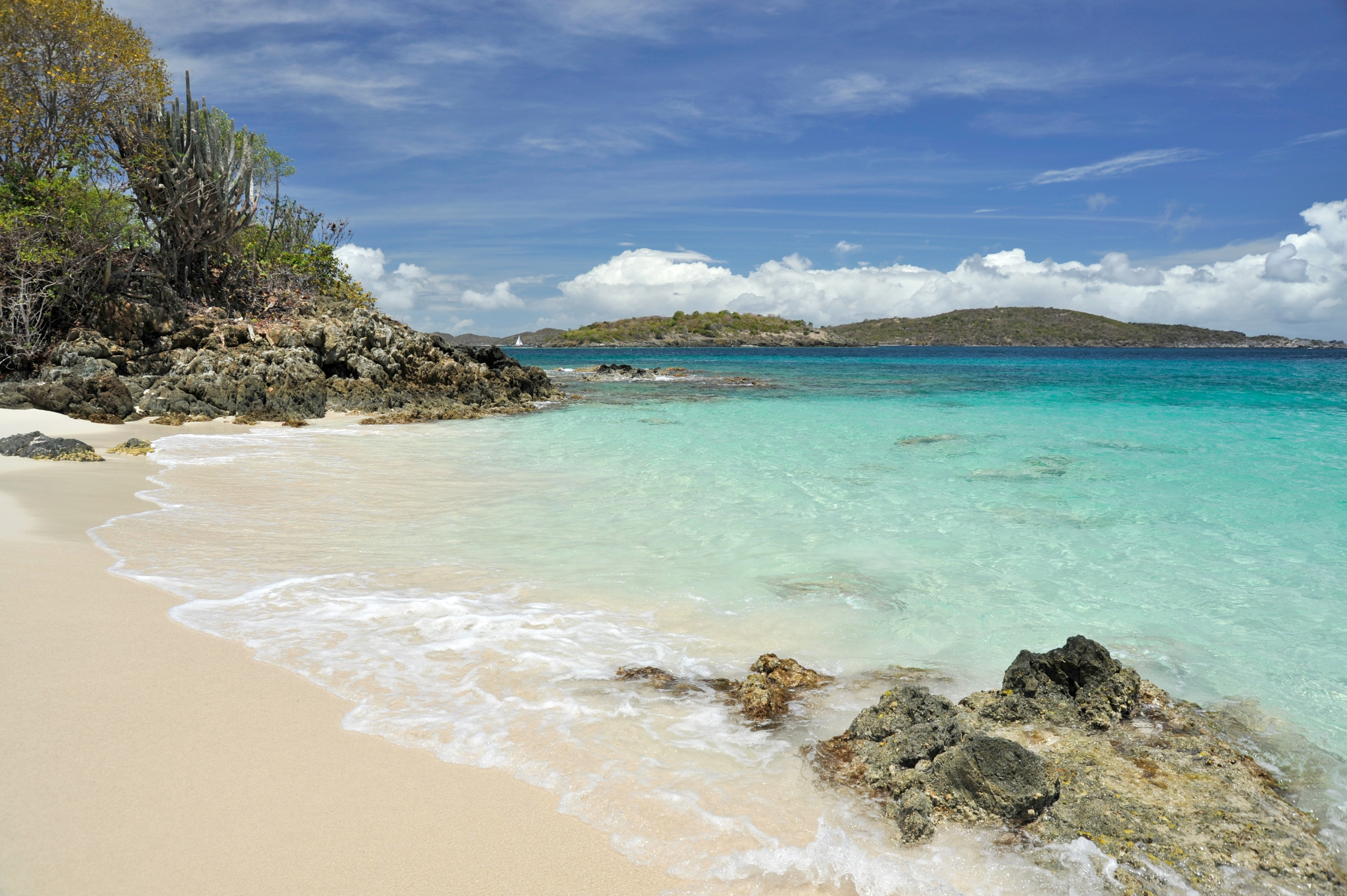
Turtle Bay Beach at Caneel Bay

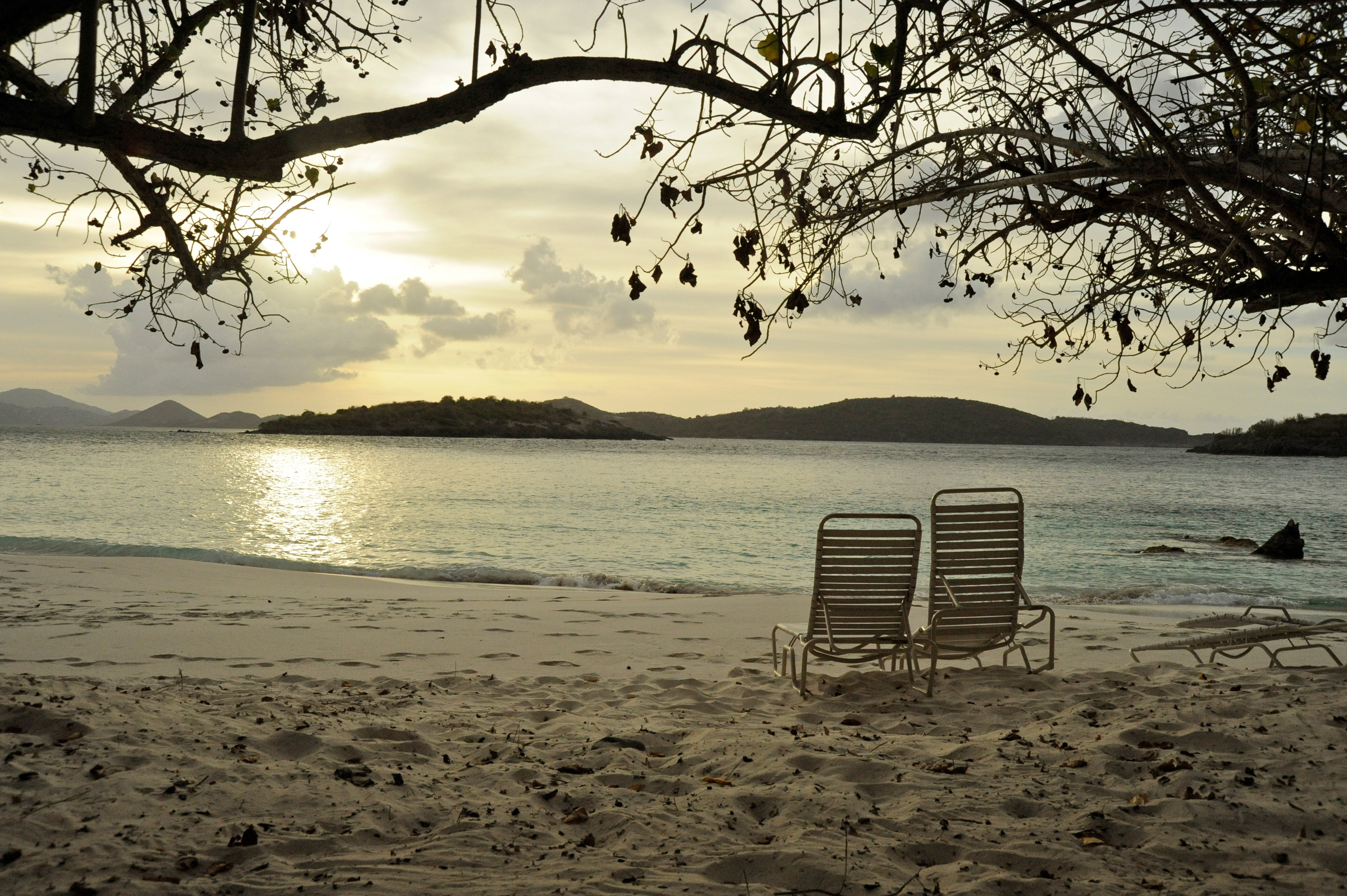
Sunset at Turtle Bay

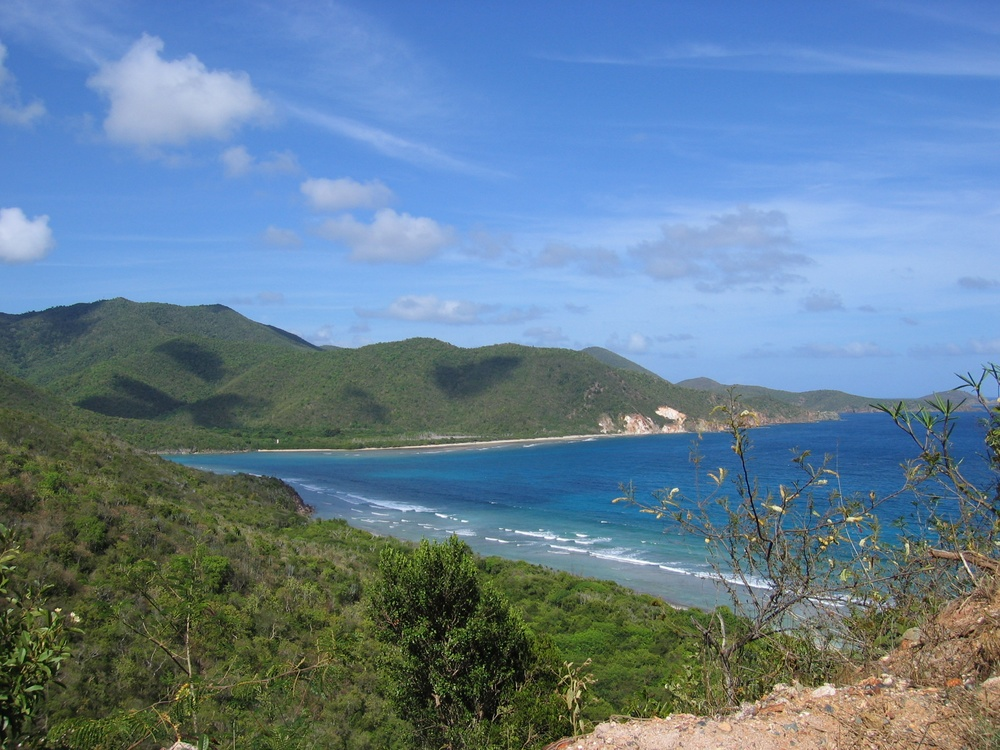
Reef Bay and Virgin Islands National Park from Cocoloba Point

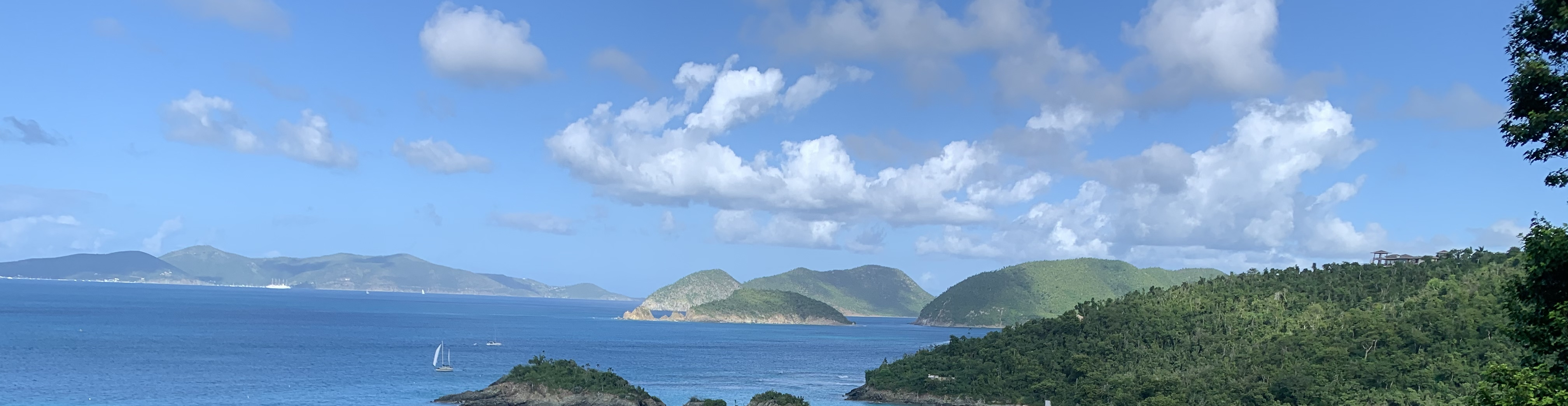
Mid day Trunk Beach, Saint John Virgin Islands National Park

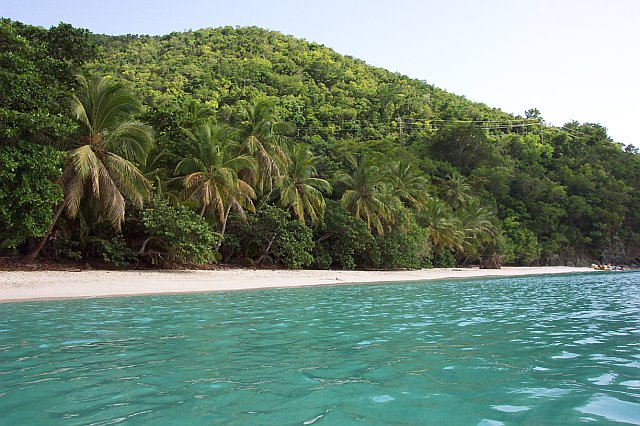
Gibney Beach on Hawksnest Bay

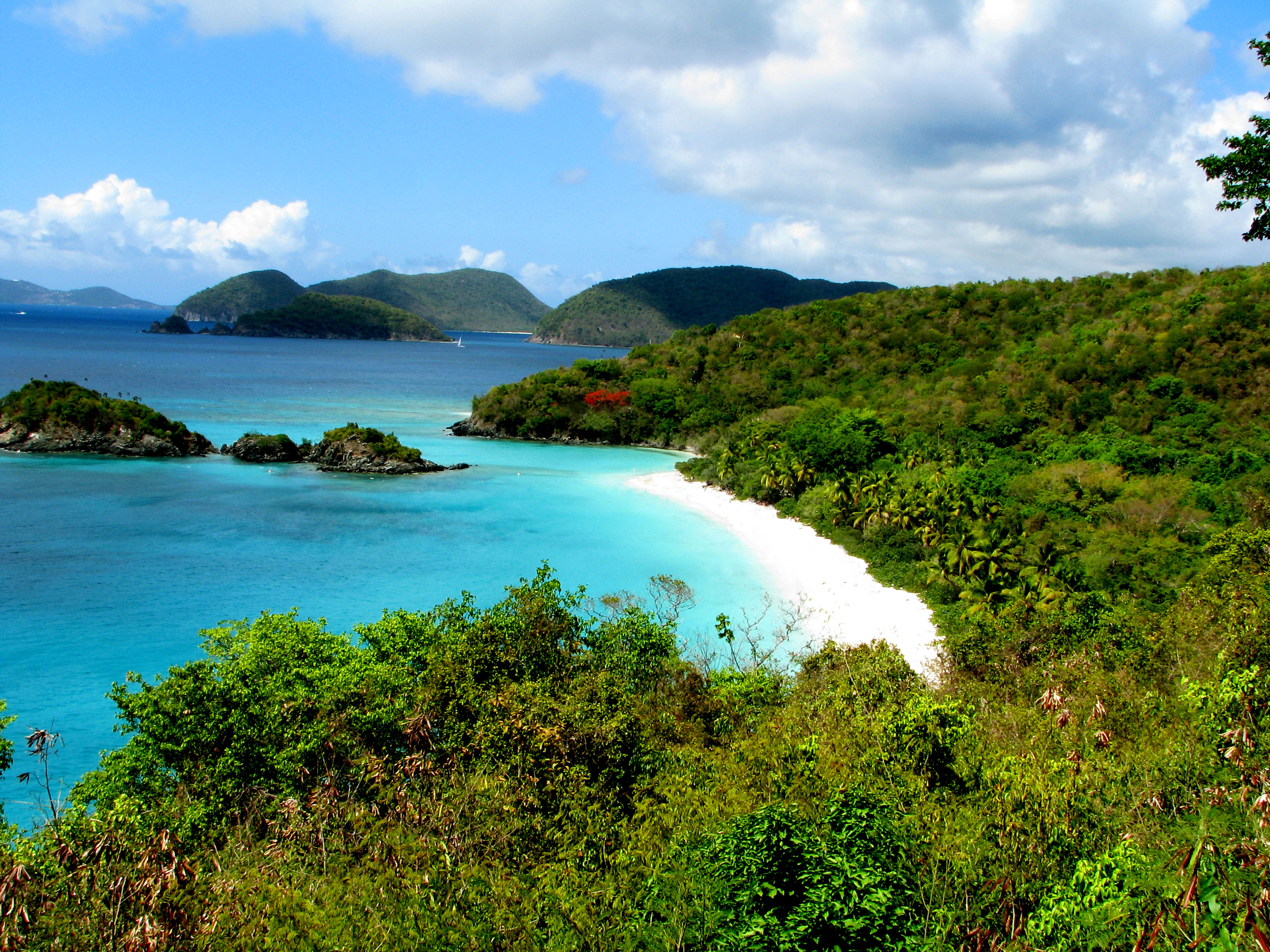
Trunk Bay

== See also ==
- Outline of the United States Virgin Islands
- Index of United States Virgin Islands-related articles
- Bibliography of the United States Virgin Islands
- Flanagan Island
- Great Thatch
- List of people from the United States Virgin Islands
- National Register of Historic Places listings on Saint John
- Norman Island
- Piracy in the British Virgin Islands
- Virgin Islands Coral Reef National Monument
