= Voznesensky (inhabited locality) =

Voznesensky (Russian: Вознесе́нский; masculine), Voznesenskaya (Вознесе́нская; feminine), or Voznesenskoye (Вознесе́нское; neuter) is the name of several inhabited localities in Russia.

== Urban localities ==
- Voznesenskoye, Voznesensky District, Nizhny Novgorod Oblast, a work settlement in Voznesensky District of Nizhny Novgorod Oblast

== Rural localities ==
- Voznesensky, Mamontovsky District, Altai Krai, a settlement in Bukansky Selsoviet of Mamontovsky District of Altai Krai
- Voznesensky, Tyumentsevsky District, Altai Krai, a settlement in Berezovsky Selsoviet of Tyumentsevsky District of Altai Krai
- Voznesensky, Nurimanovsky District, Republic of Bashkortostan, a village in Nikolsky Selsoviet of Nurimanovsky District of the Republic of Bashkortostan
- Voznesensky, Zilairsky District, Republic of Bashkortostan, a khutor in Yuldybayevsky Selsoviet of Zilairsky District of the Republic of Bashkortostan
- Voznesensky, Irkutsk Oblast, a settlement in Nizhneudinsky District of Irkutsk Oblast
- Voznesensky, Mari El Republic, a settlement in Znamensky Rural Okrug of Medvedevsky District of the Mari El Republic
- Voznesensky, Rostov Oblast, a khutor in Voznesenskoye Rural Settlement of Morozovsky District of Rostov Oblast
- Voznesensky, Stavropol Krai, a khutor in Prikalaussky Selsoviet of Petrovsky District of Stavropol Krai
- Voznesensky, Tula Oblast, a settlement in Galitsky Rural Okrug of Kamensky District of Tula Oblast
- Voznesensky, Udmurt Republic, a pochinok in Shaberdinsky Selsoviet of Zavyalovsky District of the Udmurt Republic
- Voznesensky, Voronezh Oblast, a settlement in Voznesenskoye Rural Settlement of Talovsky District of Voronezh Oblast
- Voznesenskoye, Arkhangelsk Oblast, a selo in Afanasyevsky Selsoviet of Verkhnetoyemsky District of Arkhangelsk Oblast
- Voznesenskoye, Poretsky District, Chuvash Republic, a village in Semenovskoye Rural Settlement of Poretsky District of the Chuvash Republic
- Voznesenskoye, Urmarsky District, Chuvash Republic, a selo in Shikhabylovskoye Rural Settlement of Urmarsky District of the Chuvash Republic
- Voznesenskoye, Kaliningrad Oblast, a settlement in Prigorodny Rural Okrug of Nesterovsky District of Kaliningrad Oblast
- Voznesenskoye, Khabarovsk Krai, a selo in Amursky District of Khabarovsk Krai
- Voznesenskoye, Kostroma Oblast, a selo in Orekhovskoye Settlement of Galichsky District of Kostroma Oblast
- Voznesenskoye, Kurgan Oblast, a selo in Voznesensky Selsoviet of Dalmatovsky District of Kurgan Oblast
- Voznesenskoye, Bogorodsky District, Nizhny Novgorod Oblast, a village in Aleshkovsky Selsoviet of Bogorodsky District of Nizhny Novgorod Oblast
- Voznesenskoye, Oryol Oblast, a selo in Speshnevsky Selsoviet of Korsakovsky District of Oryol Oblast
- Voznesenskoye, Perm Krai, a selo in Vereshchaginsky District of Perm Krai
- Voznesenskoye, Pskov Oblast, a village in Loknyansky District of Pskov Oblast
- Voznesenskaya, Arkhangelsk Oblast, a village in Konevsky Selsoviet of Plesetsky District of Arkhangelsk Oblast
- Voznesenskaya, Republic of Ingushetia, a stanitsa in Malgobeksky District of the Republic of Ingushetia
- Voznesenskaya, Komi Republic, a village in Palauz Selo Administrative Territory of Sysolsky District of the Komi Republic
- Voznesenskaya, Krasnodar Krai, a stanitsa in Voznesensky Rural Okrug of Labinsky District of Krasnodar Krai
