= Voznesensky =

Voznesensky (masculine), Voznesenskaya (feminine), or Voznesenskoye (neuter) may refer to:

- Voznesensky (surname)

== Places ==
- Voznesensky District, a district of Nizhny Novgorod Oblast, Russia
- Voznesenskoye Urban Settlement, several municipal urban settlements in Russia
- Voznesensky (inhabited locality) (Voznesenskaya, Voznesenskoye), several inhabited localities in Russia
- Voznesensky Avenue, a street in St. Petersburg, Russia
- Voznesensky Lane, a street in Moscow, Russia

== Other ==
- Ascension Cathedral (disambiguation), one of several cathedrals known also as Voznesensky Cathedral
- Ascension Convent, also known as Voznesensky Convent, a dismantled female cloister in the Moscow Kremlin, Moscow, Russia
