= Voznesenskoye Urban Settlement =

Voznesenskoye Urban Settlement is the name of several municipal formations in Russia.

- Voznesenskoye Urban Settlement, a municipal formation corresponding to Voznesenskoye Settlement Municipal Formation, an administrative division of Podporozhsky District of Leningrad Oblast
- Voznesenskoye Urban Settlement, a municipal formation which the Work Settlement of Voznesenskoye in Voznesensky District of Nizhny Novgorod Oblast is incorporated as

== See also ==
- Voznesensky (disambiguation)
