= Fort Ross, California =

Former Russian establishment in North America

- Fort Ross
- U.S. National Register of Historic Places
- U.S. National Historic Landmark
- California Historical Landmark
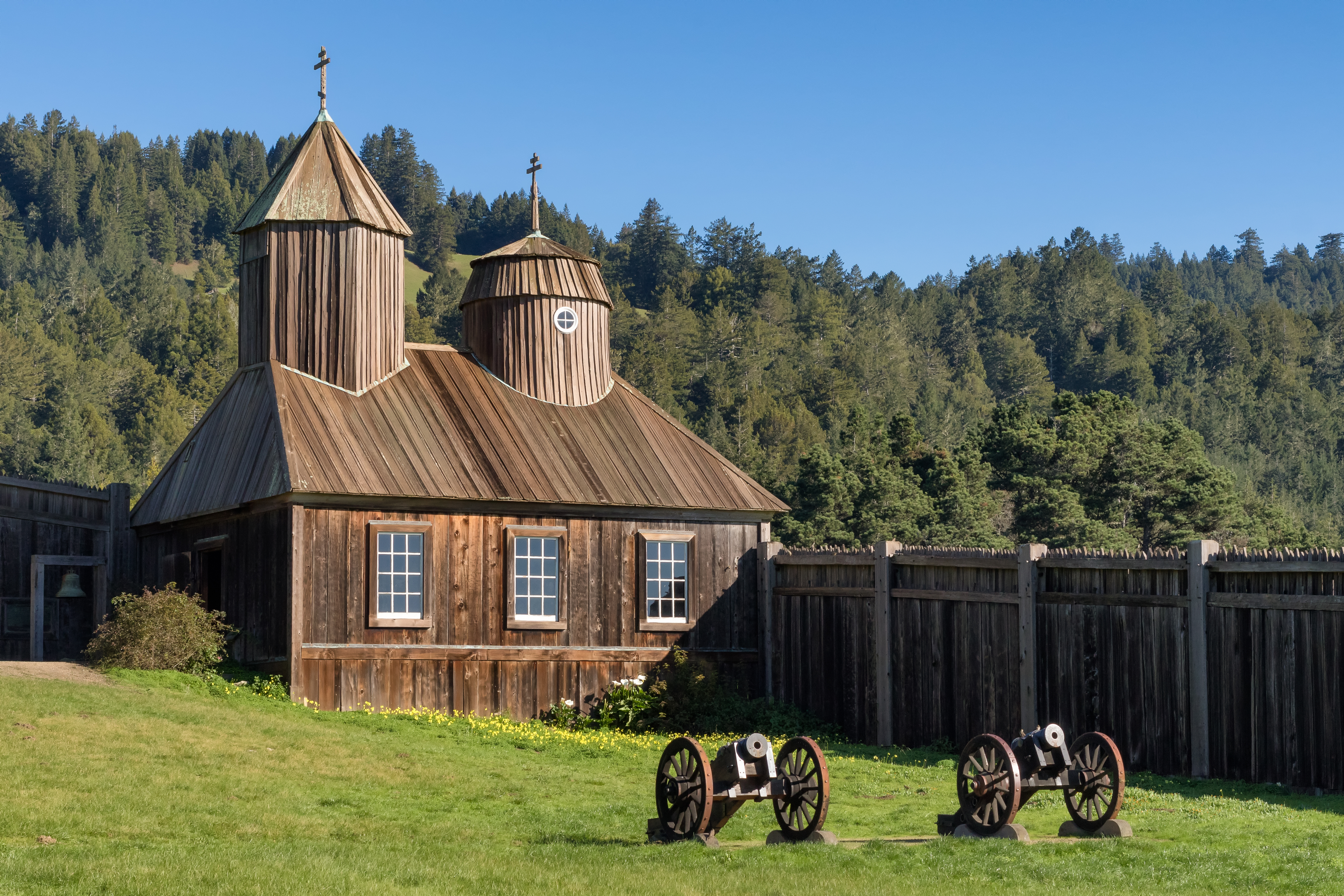
- Orthodox Holy Trinity St. Nicholas Chapel at Fort Ross, 2016

- Location within California Location within the United States
- Location: Fort Ross State Historic Park, Sonoma County, California
- Nearest city: Healdsburg, California
- Coordinates: 38°30′52″N 123°14′37″W
- Built: 1812
- NRHP reference No.: 66000239
- CHISL No.: 5

Significant dates
- Added to NRHP: October 15, 1966
- Designated NHL: November 5, 1961
- Designated CHISL: 1932

Fort Ross (Note: (Russian: Форт-Росс, romanized: Fort-Ross, alternatively: крепость Росс, krepost' Ross; Kashaya: Metini)) is a former Russian establishment on the west coast of North America in what is now Sonoma County, California, United States. It was the first multi-ethnic community north of the Spanish missions in what is now the U.S. state of California. Owned and operated by the Russian-American Company, it was the hub of the southernmost Russian settlements in North America from 1812 to 1841. Notably cosmopolitan, different ethnic groups settled in and around the fort: Native Californians, Native Alaskans, Russians, Finns, Swedes. It has been the subject of archaeological investigation and is a California Historical Landmark, a National Historic Landmark, and on the National Register of Historic Places. It is part of California's Fort Ross State Historic Park.

== Etymology ==
The present name, Fort Ross, appears first on a French chart published in 1842 by Eugène Duflot de Mofras, who visited California in 1840. The name of the fort is said to derive from the Russian word rus or ros, the same root as the word "Russia" (Pоссия, Rossiya) (Fort Ross (Russian: Форт-Росс, Kashaya mé·ṭiʔni), originally Fortress Ross (pre-reformed Russian: Крѣпость Россъ, tr. Kriepostʹ Ross). According to William Bright, "Ross" is a poetic name for a Russian in the Russian language. The Spanish sometimes called it Presidio Ruso or Presidio de Bodega.

== History ==
Beginning with Columbus in 1492, the Spanish presence in the Western Hemisphere traveled west across the Atlantic Ocean, then around or across the Americas to reach the Pacific Ocean; Misión San Diego was settled in 1769 and in 1777 the Presidio de Monterey was made the capital of Provincía de Las Californias. The Russian expansion moved east across Siberia and the northern Pacific. In 1799 the Russians established a colony in Alaska. In the early nineteenth century, Spanish and Russian expansion met along the coast of Spanish Alta California, with Russia pushing south and Spain pushing north. By that time, British and American fur trade companies had also established a coastal presence, in the Pacific Northwest, and Mexico was soon to gain independence. Mexico ceded Alta California to the United States following the Mexican–American War (1848). The history of the Russian Fort Ross settlement began during Spanish rule and ended under Mexican rule.

=== Earliest people ===
The earliest people known to have lived at the site were there during the Upper Archaic period (1000 B.C. – A.D. 500) and the Lower Emergent period (A.D. 1000–1500), but the main occupation began at A.D. 1500 and continued through 1812. Archaeological and ethnographic evidence suggest that the Native Californians lived in large and mostly permanent villages. In summer months, they had "special purpose camps" they would go to in order to get certain resources. This area was one of such camps, used for its access to tidal and marine resources.

Ethnographic evidence suggests that the area where Fort Ross would be located was a large part of Kashaya Pomo territory. Their name for the site was "Metini". Their exact arrival date is unknown, but according to linguistic and archaeological data, they moved to Metini sometime between 1,000 and 500 B.C. Archaeological data shows that the Kashaya Pomo increased their subsistence activities upon arrival at this site and gained greater diversity in their tool kits.

=== Russian-American Company ===
Russian personnel from the Alaskan colonies initially arrived in California aboard American ships. In 1803, American ship captains already involved in the sea otter maritime fur trade in California proposed several joint venture hunting expeditions to Alexander Andreyevich Baranov, on half shares using Russian supervisors and native Alaskan hunters to hunt fur seals and otters along the Alta and Baja Californian coast. Subsequent reports by the Russian hunting parties of uncolonized stretches of coast encouraged Baranov, the Chief Administrator of the Russian-American Company (RAC), to consider a settlement in California north of the limit of Spanish occupation in San Francisco. In 1806 the Russian Ambassador to Japan, and RAC director Nikolay Rezanov, undertook an exploratory trade mission to California to establish a formal means of procuring food supplies for his Alaskan colony in exchange for Russian goods in San Francisco. While guests of the Spanish, Rezanov's captain, Lt. Khvostov, explored and charted the coast north of San Francisco Bay and found it completely unoccupied by other European powers. Upon his return to Novoarkhangelsk (New Archangel), Rezanov recommended to Baranov, and the Emperor Alexander, that a settlement be established in California.

This settlement [Ross] has been organized through the initiative of the Company. Its purpose is to establish a [Russian] settlement there or in some other place not occupied by Europeans, and to introduce agriculture there by planting hemp, flax and all manner of garden produce; they also wish to introduce livestock breeding in the outlying areas, both horses and cattle, hoping that the favorable climate, which is almost identical to the rest of California, and the friendly reception on the part of the indigenous people, will assist in its success.

— From an 1813 report to Emperor Alexander from the Russian American Company Council, concerning trade with California and the establishment of Fort Ross

Fort Ross was established by Commerce Counselor Ivan Kuskov of the Russian-American Company. In 1808 Baranov sent two ships, the Kad'yak and the Sv. Nikolai, on an expedition south to establish settlements for the RAC with instructions to bury "secret signs" (possession plaques). Kuskov, on the Kad'yak, was instructed to bury the plaques, with an appropriate possession ceremony, at Trinidad, Bodega Bay, and on the shore north of San Francisco, indicating Russian claims to the land. After sailing into Bodega Bay in 1809 on the Kad'yak and returning to Novoarkhangelsk with beaver skins and 1,160 otter pelts, Baranov ordered Kuskov to return and establish an agricultural settlement in the area. After a failed attempt in 1811, Kuskov sailed the brig Chirikov back to Bodega Bay in March 1812, naming it the Gulf of Rumyantsev or Rumyantsev Bay (залив Румянцева, Zaliv Rumyantseva) in honor of the Russian Minister of Commerce Count Nikolai Petrovich Rumyantzev. He also named the Russian River the Slavic River (Славянка, Slavyanka). On his return, Kuskov found American otter hunting ships and otter now scarce in Bodega Bay. After exploring the area they ended up selecting a place 15 miles (24 km) north that the native Kashaya Pomo people called Mad shui nui or Metini. Metini, the seasonal home of the Kashaya Pomo, had a modest anchorage and abundant natural resources and would become the Russian settlement of Fortress Ross.

Fort Ross was established as an agricultural base from which the northern settlements could be supplied with food, while also continuing trade with Alta California. Yet during its initial ten years of operations the post "provided the company with nothing but heavy expenses for its maintenance." Fort Ross itself was the hub of a number of smaller Russian settlements comprising what was called "Fortress Ross" on official documents and charts produced by the Company itself. Colony Ross referred to the entire area where Russians had settled. These settlements constituted the southernmost Russian colony in North America and were spread over an area stretching from Point Arena to Tomales Bay. The colony included a port at Bodega Bay called Port Rumyantsev (порт Румянцев), a sealing station on the Farallon Islands 18 miles (29 km) out to sea from San Francisco, and by 1830 three small farming communities called "ranchos" (Ранчо): Chernykh (Ранчо Егора Черных, Rancho Egora Chernykh) near present-day Graton, Khlebnikov (Ранчо Василия Хлебникова, Rancho Vasiliya Khlebnikova) a mile north of the present day town of Bodega in the Salmon Creek valley, and Kostromitinov (Ранчо Петра Костромитинова, Rancho Petra Kostromitinova) on the Russian River.

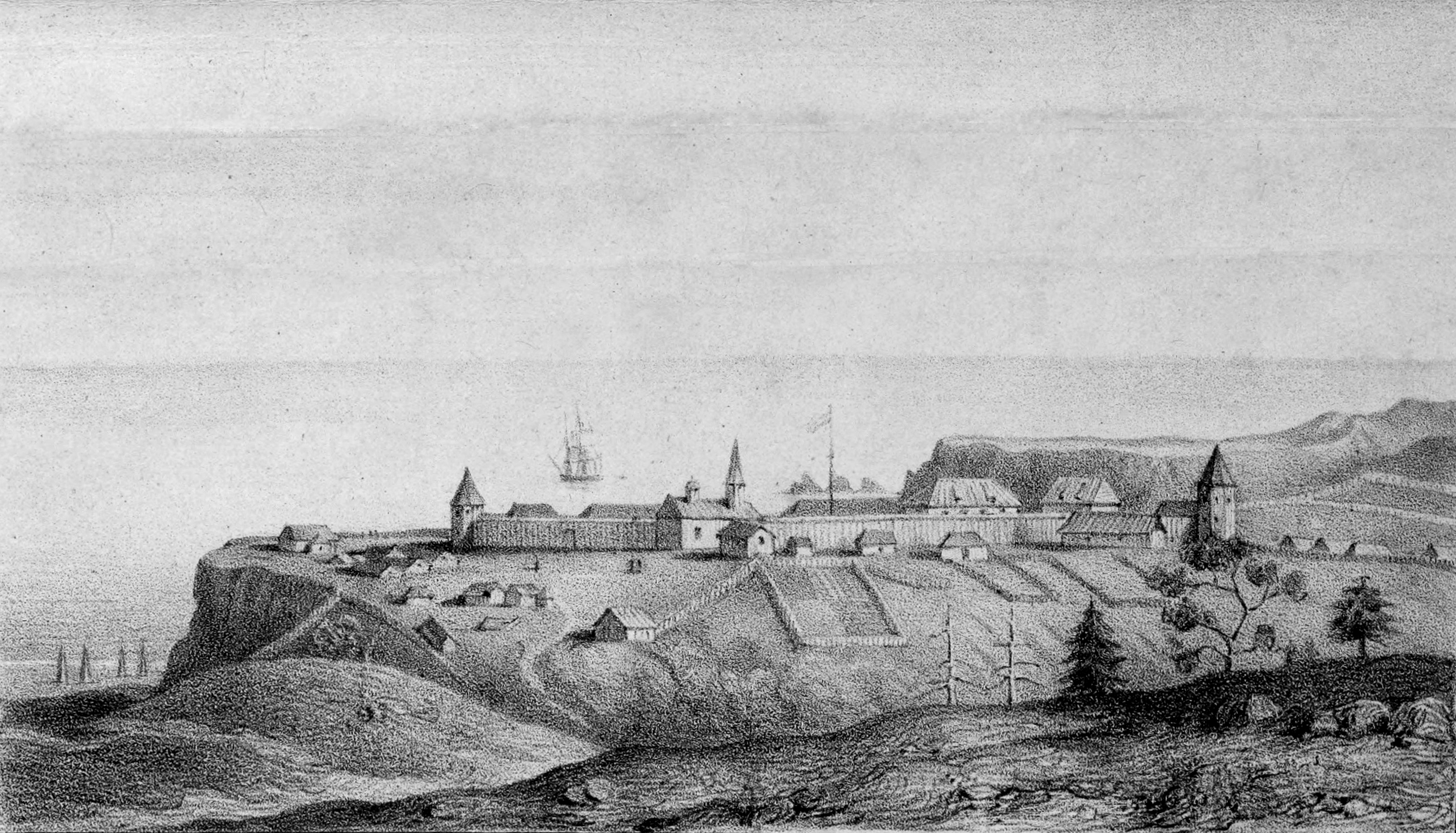
A view of Fort Ross in 1828 by A. B. Duhaut-Cilly. From the archives of the Fort Ross Historical Society

=== Local enterprise ===
In addition to farming and manufacturing, the Company carried on its fur-trading business at Fort Ross, but by 1817, after 20 years of intense hunting by Spanish, American and British ships—followed by Russian efforts—sea otters had been practically eliminated from the area.

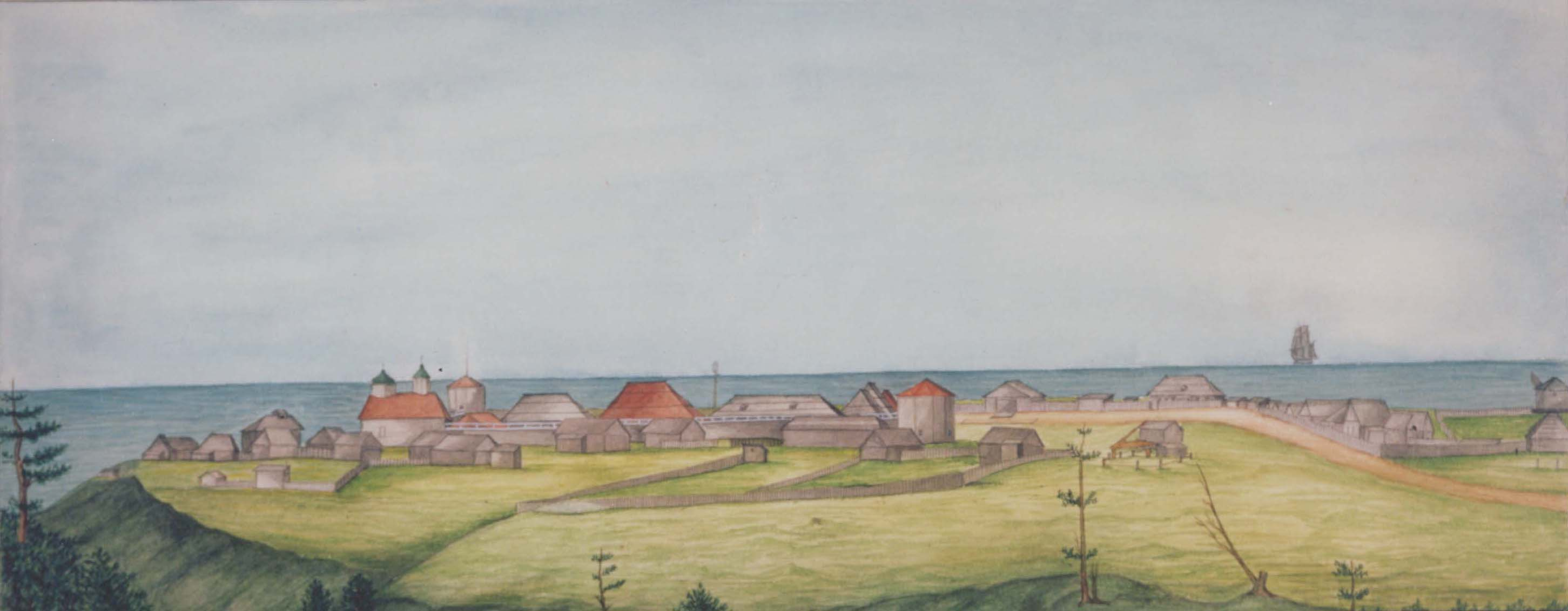
Settlement Ross, 1841, by Ilya Gavrilovich Voznesensky

Fort Ross was the site of California's first windmills and shipbuilding. Russian scientists associated with the colony were among the first to record California's cultural and natural history. The Russian managers introduced many European innovations such as glass windows, stoves, and all-wood housing into Alta California. Together with the surrounding settlement, Fort Ross was home to Russian subjects, who included various ethnicities native to Eastern Europe and Asia, as well as North Pacific Natives, Aleuts, Kashaya (Pomo), and Alaskan Creoles. The native populations of the Sonoma and Napa County regions were affected by smallpox, measles and other infectious diseases that were common across Asia, Europe, and Africa. One instance can be traced to the settlement of Fort Ross. The first vaccination in California history was carried out by the crew of the Kutuzov, a Russian-American Company vessel arriving from Callao, Peru which brought vaccine to Monterey in August 1821. The Kutuzov's surgeon vaccinated 54 people. Another instance of disease prevention was when a visiting Hudson's Bay Company hunting party was refused entry to the Colony in 1833, when it was feared that a malaria epidemic which had devastated the Central Valley was carried by its members. In 1837 a very deadly epidemic of smallpox that came from this settlement via New Archangel wiped out most native people in the Sonoma and Napa County regions.

=== Mexican response ===
Between 1824 and 1836 the Mexicans found during every exploratory effort north of present-day San Rafael and west of Sonoma increasing evidence of Russian presence. They discovered at least three Russian farms that had been established inland from Fort Ross. Governor José Figueroa wanted to counter the Russians' gradual encroachment in Northern California. In 1834, he granted Rancho Petaluma to Mariano Guadalupe Vallejo. In 1835 he appointed Vallejo as Comandante of the Fourth Military District and Director of Colonization of the Northern Frontier, the highest military command in Northern California, and encouraged him to build the Presidio of Sonoma. To extend the settlements in the direction of Fort Ross, Vallejo granted his brother-in-law, Captain John B. R. Cooper, who had married his sister Encarnacion, Rancho El Molino (about 17,892-acre (72.41 km^{2})). The grant was confirmed by Governor Nicolás Gutiérrez in 1836.

Upon his arrival in Alta California in 1839, John Sutter was attracted to the land near the Sacramento River. To obtain the land and permission to settle in the territory, he went to the capital at Monterey and requested a grant from Governor Juan Bautista Alvarado. Alvarado saw Sutter's plan of establishing a colony in the Central Valley as useful in "buttressing the frontier which he was trying to maintain against Indians, Russians, Americans and British." Sutter persuaded Governor Alvarado to grant him 48,400 acres (19,600 ha) of land for the sake of curtailing American encroachment on the Mexican territory of California. Sutter was given the right to "represent in the Establishment of New Helvetia all the laws of the country, to function as political authority and dispenser of justice, in order to prevent the robberies committed by adventurers from the United States, to stop the invasion of savage Indians, and the hunting and trading by companies from the Columbia (river)." He named the settlement New Helvetia. In an 1841 inventory for John Sutter that described the settlement surrounding the fort: "twenty-four planked dwellings with glazed windows, a floor and a ceiling; each had a garden. There were eight sheds, eight bathhouses and ten kitchens."

=== Decline of Fort Ross ===
By 1839, the settlement's agricultural importance had decreased considerably, the local population of fur-bearing marine mammals had been long depleted by international over-hunting, and the recently secularized California missions no longer supplemented the agricultural needs of the Alaskan colonies. Following the formal trade agreement in 1838 between the Russian-American Company in New Archangel and Hudson's Bay Company at Fort Vancouver and Fort Langley for their agricultural needs, the settlement at Fort Ross was no longer needed to supply the Alaskan colonies with food. The Russian-American Company consequently offered the settlement to various potential purchasers, and in 1841 it was sold to John Sutter, a Mexican citizen of Swiss origin, soon to be renowned for the discovery of gold at his lumber mill in the Sacramento valley. Although the settlement was sold for $30,000 to Sutter, some Russian historians assert the sum was never paid; therefore legal title of the settlement was never transferred to Sutter and the area still belongs to the Russian people. A recent Sutter biography however, asserts that Sutter's agent, Peter Burnett, paid the Russian-American Company agent William M. Steuart $19,788 in "notes and gold" on April 13, 1849, thereby settling the outstanding debt for Fort Ross and Bodega.

=== 20th century ===
Possession of Fort Ross passed from Sutter through successive private hands and finally to George W. Call. In 1903, the stockade and about 3 acres (12,000 m^{2}) of land were purchased from the Call family by the California Historical Landmarks Commission. Three years later it was turned over to the State of California for preservation and restoration as a state historic monument. Since then, the state has acquired more of the surrounding land for preservation purposes. California Department of Parks and Recreation as well as many volunteers put extensive efforts into restoration and reconstruction work in the Fort.

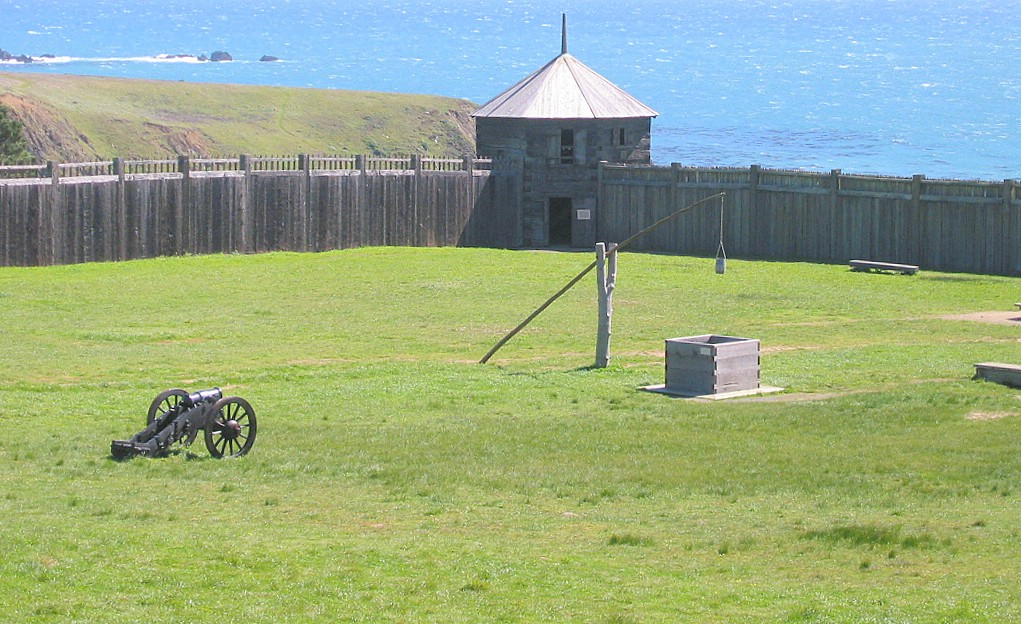
Southwest blockhouse, with the well in the foreground

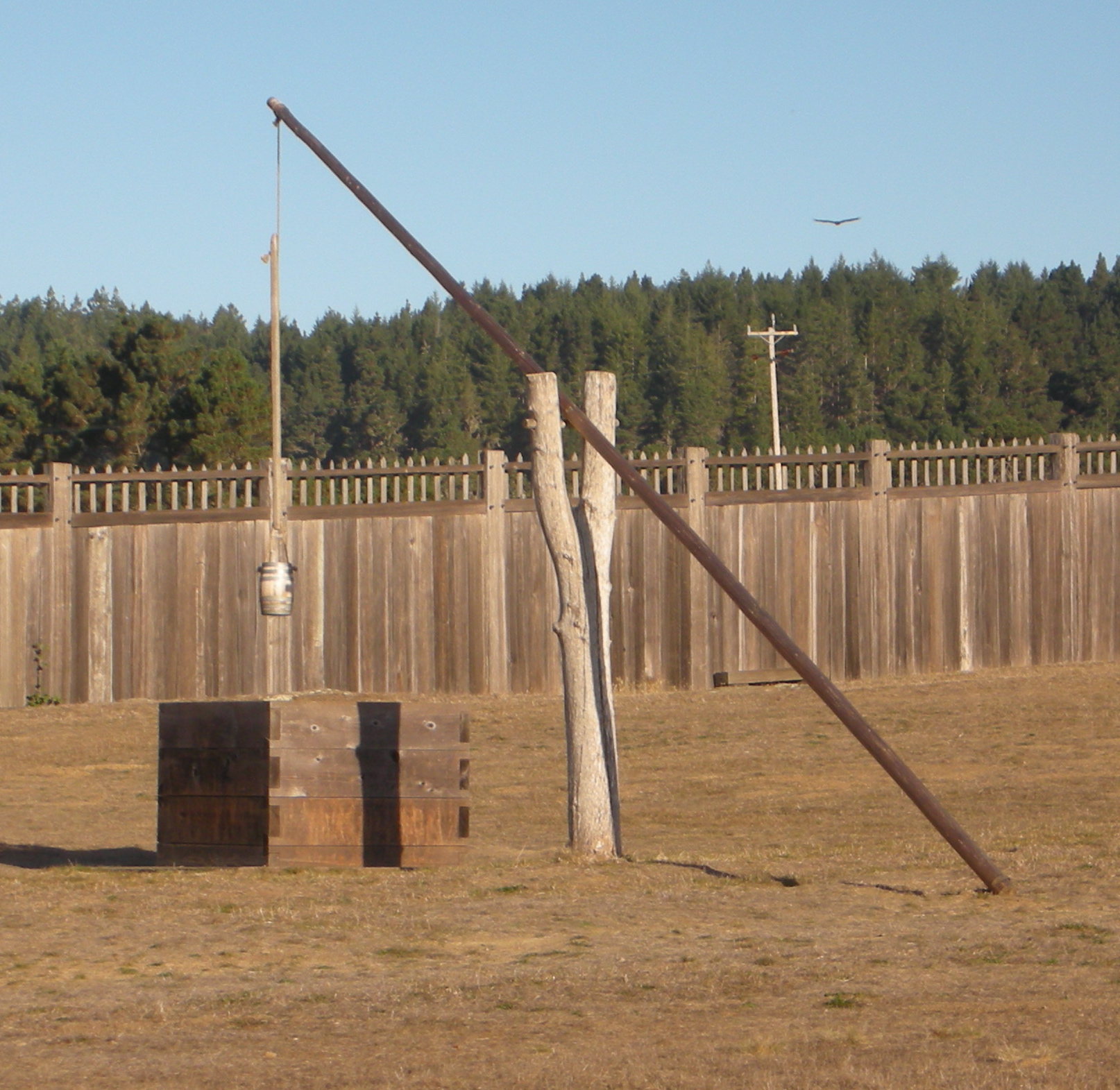
Well

CA 1 once bisected Fort Ross. It entered from the northeast where the Kuskov House once stood, and exited through the main gate to the southwest. The road was eventually diverted, and the parts of the fort that had been demolished for the road were rebuilt. The old roadway can still be seen going from the main gate to the northwest; the rest (within the fort and extending northeast) has been removed. CA 1 moved to its current alignment sometime in the mid–late 1970s.

Most of the existing buildings on the site are reconstructions. Cooperative research efforts with Russian archives will help to correct interpretive errors present in structures that date from the Cold-War period. The only original structure remaining is the Rotchev House. Known as the "Commandant's House" from the 1940s through the 1970s, it was the residence of the last manager, Aleksandr Rotchev. Renovated in 1836 from an existing structure, it was titled the "new commandant's house" in the 1841 inventory to differentiate it from the "old commandant's house" (Kuskov House). The Rotchev House, or in original documents, "Administrator's House", is at the center of efforts to "re-interpret" Russia's part in California's colonial history. The Fort Ross Interpretive Association has received several federally funded grants to restore both exterior and interior elements. While its exterior has been partially restored, its interior is currently undergoing restoration to reflect the recent research that shows a more cosmopolitan and refined aspect of colonial life at the Fort.

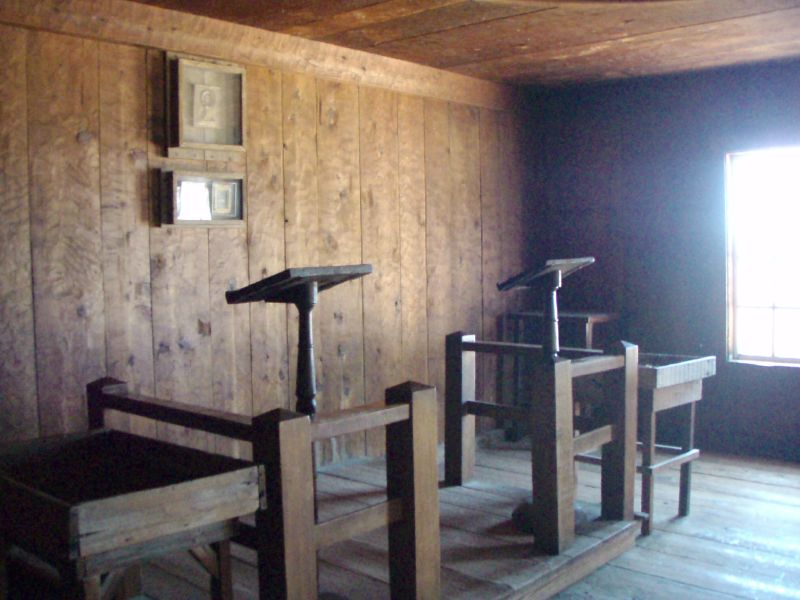
Interior of Fort Ross Chapel.

Fort Ross living history day

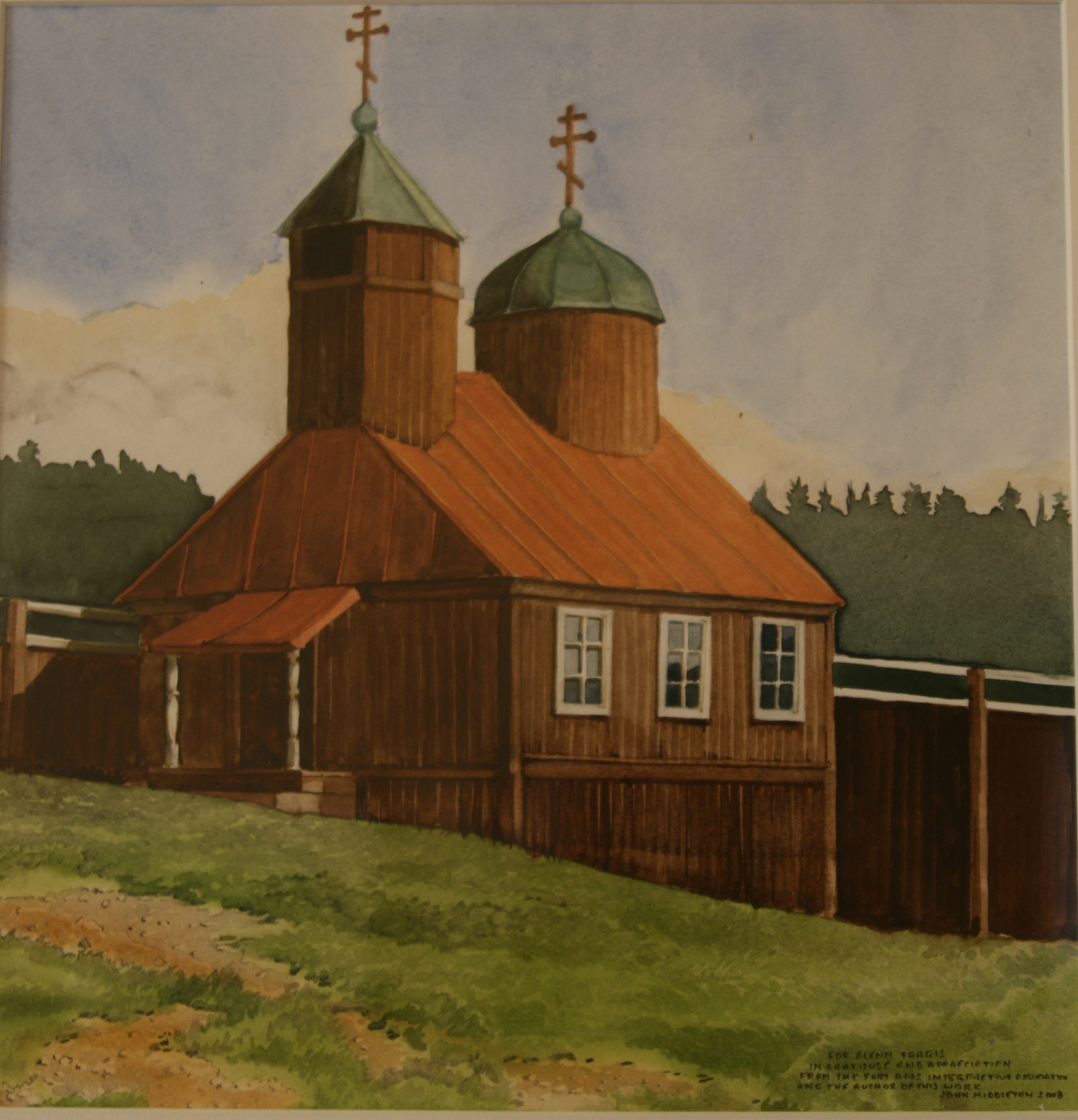
Artist's reconstruction of Chapel's appearance in 1841

The Fort Ross Chapel collapsed in the 1906 San Francisco earthquake but much of the original structural woodwork remained and it was re-erected in 1916, but retained the appearance of the American ranch-period modifications when it was used as a stable. Several other restorations ensued, but none incorporated the information in Voznesensky's 1841 water-colour which portray the chapel with copper-clad cupola and tower, and red-metal roof. "The Fort Ross Chapel was found eligible for designation as a National Historic Landmark in 1969, architecturally significant as a rare U.S. example of a log church constructed on a Russian quadrilateral plan. An accidental fire destroyed the chapel on October 5, 1970. This loss of the original workmanship and materials of the chapel led to withdrawal of the Chapel's Landmark designation in 1971. A complete reconstruction of the chapel was undertaken in 1973 and the Fort Ross settlement, as a whole, retains its National Historic Landmark designation." The current chapel was built during the intensive restoration activity that followed, but retains the American ranch period appearance.

A large orchard, including several original trees planted by the Russians, is located inland on Fort Ross Road in Sonoma County.

Fort Ross is now a part of Fort Ross State Historic Park, open to the public. In addition to fishing, hiking, surfing, exploring tide pools, picnicking, whale watching, and bird watching, the Park has become a popular destination for scuba divers, some of whom visit Fort Ross Reef. The wreckage of the SS Pomona lies just offshore Fort Ross State Park.

== Fort Ross Cemetery ==
In 1990–1992, the Fort Ross Cemetery, located on a ridge adjacent to the settlement, was cleared and 135 gravesites were identified by archaeological excavations. The project was undertaken in collaboration with the Russian Orthodox Church (ROC), the Kodiak Area Native Association, the Kashaya Pomo, the Bodega Miwok, and the California Native American Heritage Commission. The graves were mostly contained in the main cemetery, across the fort and in view of the chapel, but two grave sites were found outside this area. Russian Orthodox tradition states that the dead must be buried in view of a chapel, so it was unexpected to find people buried out of view of it. It is not known why these people were buried outside the main cemetery, but it is possibly because they were buried before the arrival of the Russian Orthodox community and their religious beliefs.

The cemetery served as a burial ground for both Russians and native people, showing no differentiation of rank or status. Out of the 135 graves excavated, 131 had human remains, and four were empty. The empty graves may have been due to poor preservation of human remains or the earlier removal of the human remains to a different grave site. Based on the grave dimensions, it is estimated that half of the burials were children, who represented 47% of the population of Fort Ross by 1838. Studies show that disease was a common reason for death, as well as various accidents and drownings.

Bodies were generally buried in redwood coffins, or at the very least, a cloth shroud. In 56% of graves, crosses or religious medallions were found. Other items that have been found in the graves have included buttons, glass beads, earrings, dishes, and cloth. The bones were not well preserved due to the soil having a high level of acidity. Redwood tends to be acidic, so this contributed to the lower levels of bone preservation.

In consultation with Reverend Vladimir Derugin of the ROC, researchers were able to confirm that the burial practices followed traditional Russian Orthodox canon and norms, despite having been conducted in a remote frontier outpost. At the conclusion of the project, all unearthed remains were returned to their grave sites, and a religious reburial ceremony was conducted.

=== Conflicting views on the excavation ===
When archaeologists began excavating the cemetery, there were many stakeholders they had to consider. Fort Ross is owned by the state of California and is operated by the department of parks and recreation, so they had to give permission in order for the excavation to occur. Also, the Fort Ross Interpretive Association (FRIA), who work with the park to communicate the history to the public were a part of it. Since Native American remains were involved, archaeologists had to get permissions from the nearest descendants they could find; in this case, it was the Kashaya Pomo. Another group that had a part in the excavation was the Kodiak Area Native Association (KANA), because remains of Alaskan natives were buried in the cemetery. The Russian Orthodox Church was also involved because the fort was a Russian outpost; however, there were two separate groups within the church that both laid claim to the cemetery, so archaeologists consulted with them both as to avoid friction.

With all of these different groups involved, there were a few conflicting views on what to do with the remains and how to treat them. For instance, the Russians thought that everyone buried in the cemetery, including the Kashaya and Alaskan natives, were a part of the Orthodox religion, meaning they had converted. However, many of the Kashaya did not agree with this; they had oral accounts saying that the Kashaya had moved bodies from the Russian cemetery to be buried in a more traditional manner. (Kashaya traditional burial requires that the bodies be cremated.) While some elders were curious about the excavation, to see if the archaeological evidence supported their accounts of Kashaya being removed, the majority did not want their burials excavated. Archaeologists agreed, and said they would do their best to not excavate any Kashaya graves—and if they did, they would rebury them. Later analysis would show that none of the exhumed graves were Kashaya. In contrast, the Russians supported the excavations, but wanted all of the remains reburied in the graves from which they came.

== Windmills at Fort Ross ==
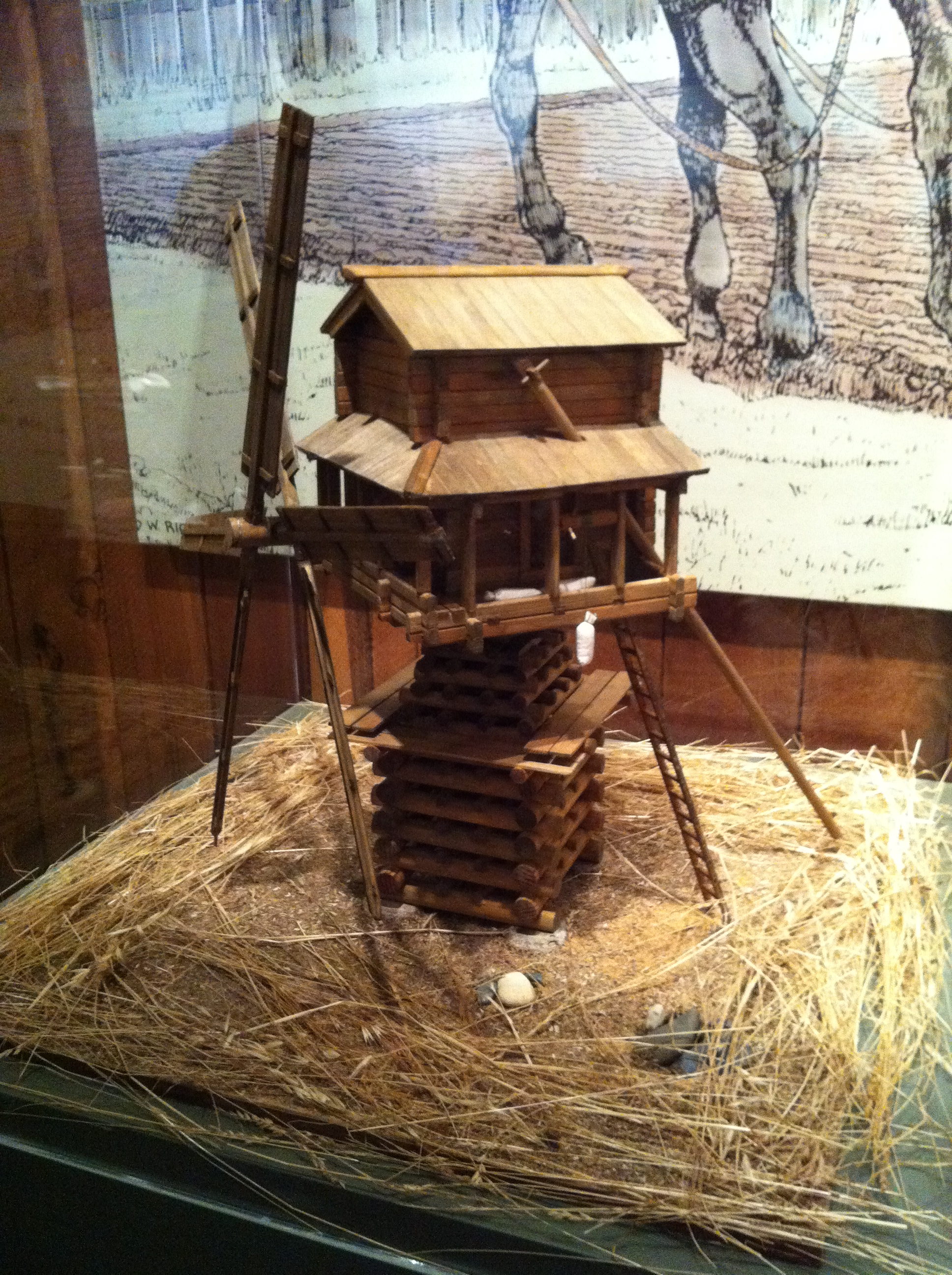
Miniature replica of windmill – Stolbovki

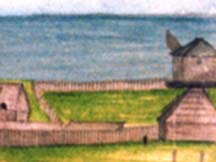
Detail of the windmill from View of Settlement Ross (1841) by Ilya Voznesensky.

Much archaeological research has been done at Fort Ross, more recently in search of the windmills. The historical record states there were at least three windmills, possibly four, although the fourth may have been a watermill or a man- or animal-powered mill. The windmills have gained much attention because various accounts of their exact locations are sometimes inconsistent and vague. There was, in fact, one windmill located not far from the northern end of the blockade, which was most likely used to grind wheat and barley flour. Based on the descriptions given by people who visited Fort Ross, it has been concluded that the main windmill, located outside the blockade, was the traditional style Russian stolbovki. The root word "stolb" means thick vertical pole.

At the time, the only mills in California, which was under Spanish/Mexican rule, were either water or animal powered. What made the Russian mills significant is that they were the first windmills in California. The Russian stolbovki needed a very large center post which was sunk into the ground and supported the transverse pole. The transverse pole was rotated by the wings of the mill that faced the wind current. Archaeologists are searching for the remains of this center post, which would have left a significant indentation in the ground.

In October 2012 a modern interpretation of one of Fort Ross' windmills was erected and placed near the parking lot and visitors center of the State Historic Park. The windmill was built completely by hand, using the same methods that were presumed to have been used in the days of the Russian American settlement. Its pieces were constructed in Russia and shipped to California, where it was fully assembled and now stands as the only working Russian windmill of this style. It has been pointed out, however, that this is a replica of a 19th or early 20th century Vologda Province windmill, and only bears a slight resemblance to the windmill recorded at Fort Ross in 1841 by Ilya Voznesensky. In Voznesensky's painting the roof is hipped rather than peaked, and there is no roofed exterior porch on the upper left-hand side. The supporting cribbing is covered in the 1841 rendition, and the proportions are noticeably different. The placement near the parking lot at Fort Ross also conflicts with archeologists' views of the actual site of the windmill as portrayed by Voznesensky.

== The Fort Ross Archaeological Project ==
The Fort Ross Archeological Project began in the summer of 1988, directed by Professor Kent Lightfoot of the University of California, Berkeley. The purpose was to "examine the nature, extent, and direction of cultural change among native workers in a pluralistic, hierarchically structured, mercantile colony." In addition to the Archaeological Research Facility and Department of Anthropology at the University of California, Berkeley, the project saw collaboration with the California Department of Parks and Recreation, Sonoma State University, Santa Rosa Junior College, the Sakhalin Regional Museum, and the Kodiak Area Native Association.

In 1988 and 1989, an encompassing survey of the original 2.8 square kilometer property of Fort Ross Historic State Park was done to determine the size, layout, and archaeological components of native settlements, before and after the establishment of Fort Ross. After dividing the park into a dozen survey blocks in the area of the reconstructed stockade complex, a pedestrian survey of each respective block was undertaken to detect any archaeological remnants. Thirty sites were recorded, mapped, and underwent surface collection. Including the use of historical maps and any presence of temporally-sensitive project point and historical artifact types, several methods were used in determining the chronology of sites; however, this was done primarily by the hydration band measurements of obsidian artifacts. The Obsidian Hydration Laboratory of Sonoma State University completed research of the hydration rates of several local sources of obsidian. 329 obsidian artifacts were collected from Fort Ross sites and analyzed by the laboratory. Sites were dated from the range of 6000–3000 B.C. to A.D. 1812 and onward.

Further lithic materials were analyzed, employing the use of artifact classes as published by the California Office of Historic Preservation. Faunal remains were identified to the most viable discrete taxon and element, with counts made of the minimum number of individuals.

Of the 30 sites cataloged, 27 were used primarily by native Alaskans in addition to, or alternatively, native Californians. Of these 27, eight were determined to have belonged to the historical period including the Russian occupation of Fort Ross.

=== Native Alaskan Village Site and Fort Ross Beach Site ===
Designated CA-SON-1897/H and CA-SON-1898/H respectively, the Native Alaskan Village site and the Fort Ross Beach Site are two sites of particular interest. The former is situated on top of a raised marine terrace and located 30 meters south of the Russian stockade, and the latter resides below the former, traversing a cliff face 30 meters long.

The Native Alaskan Village site was the subject of an investigation into its spatial organization, seeing "topographic mapping of surface features, systematic surface collection and generation of artifact distribution maps, and geophysical investigations involving both magnetometer and soil resistance survey." The aforementioned surface collection resulted in the discovery of "glass beads, ceramics, projectile points, flakes, and worked bone artifacts over a 200 x 40 m area."

In addition, 13 surface features were identified and mapped in the Native Alaskan Village site. Two of these were excavated, leading to the unearthing of portions of a set of pit houses. These were referred to as the East Central and South Pit features. A redwood fence line outside the South Pit feature was also discovered, as well as several contextually rich deposits which contained dense concentrations of faunal elements and artifacts, with two in particular being found in the field seasons of 1992 and 1993. Referred to as the East Central, South, and Abalone Dump "Bone Beds," after extensive 3D mapping of these deposits, crews cataloged thousands of shells, bones, fire-cracked rocks, chipped-stone, ground-stone, glass, metal, and ceramic. These deposits led to the detection of several houses that had been abandoned, and thus were interpreted as being household dumps.

The Fort Ross Beach site saw subsurface testing which led to the discovery of a wide range of faunal remains from domesticated, terrestrial, and sea mammals to fish, birds, and shells of several organisms. Among other finds, a multitude of historical ceramics, lithics, glass beads, glass beverage container fragments, bone artifacts were discovered, as well as debitage from bone tool production. Investigation led to the belief that the site was formed for the most part by activities which had occurred at the base of the cliff and from refuse being discarded over the cliff from the Native Alaskan Village.

== Colonial administrators ==
Fort Ross colony had five administrators:

- Ivan A. Kuskov, 1812–1821
- Karl J. von Schmidt, 1821–1824
- Pavel I. Shelikhov, 1824–1830
- Petr S. Kostromitinov, 1830–1838
- Aleksander G. Rotchev, 1838–1841

== Derived place names ==
Along with its status as a National Historic Landmark, the fort itself and the surrounding area are part of Fort Ross State Historic Park. Fort Ross also designates the small rural community that exists between the towns of Cazadero, Jenner, and Gualala, with the Fort Ross Elementary School at its center.

== Milestones ==
=== 16th and 17th centuries ===
- 1542–1543: Juan Rodríguez Cabrillo visits San Diego, Farallon Islands, Cape Mendocino, Cape Blanco.
- 1579–1639: Russian frontiersmen penetrate eastward to Siberia and the Pacific.
- 1602: Sebastián Vizcaíno explores to the Columbia River region, naming the Farallon Islands, Point Reyes and the Rio Sebastian (present-day Russian River).

=== 18th century ===
- 1728: Vitus Bering and Alexei Chirikov explore Bering Strait.
- 1741–1742: Bering and Chirikov claim Russian America (Alaska) for Russia.
- 1769: Gaspar de Portola traveling overland discovers San Francisco Bay.
- 1775: Juan Francisco de la Bodega y Quadra anchors in outer Bodega Bay, trades with the local Indians.
- 1784: Russians Grigoriy Shelikhov and his wife Nataliya establish a base on Kodiak Island.
- 1799: Russian American Company (with manager Aleksandr Baranov) establishes Novo Arkhangelsk (New Archangel, now Sitka, Alaska).

=== 19th century ===
- 1806: Nikolai Rezanov, Imperial Ambassador to Japan and director of the Russian American Company, visits the Presidio of San Francisco.
- 1806–1813: American ships bring Russians and Alaska Natives on 12 California fur hunts.
- 1808–1811: Ivan Kuskov lands in Bodega Bay (Port Rumiantsev), builds structures and hunts in the region.
- 1812, March 15: Ivan Kuskov with 25 Russians and 80 Native Alaskans arrives at Port Rumiantsev and proceeds north to establish Fortress Ross.
- 1812, September 11: The Fortress is dedicated on the name-day of Emperor Aleksandr I.
- 1816: Russian exploring expedition led by Captain Otto von Kotzebue visits California with naturalists Adelbert von Chamisso, Johann Friedrich von Eschscholtz, and artist Louis Choris.
- 1817, September 22: Russian Chief Administrator Captain Leonty Gagemeister concludes treaty with local tribal chiefs for possession of property near Fortress Ross. First such treaty concluded with native peoples in California.
- 1818: The Rumiantsev, first of four ships built at Fortress Ross. The Buldakov, Volga and Kiakhta follow, as well as several longboats.
- 1821: Russian Imperial decree gives Native Alaskans and Creoles civil rights protected by law
- 1836: Fr. Veniaminov (St. Innocent) visits Fort Ross, conducts services, and carries out census.
- 1841, December: Rotchev sells Fort Ross and accompanying land to John Sutter.

=== 20th and 21st centuries ===
- 1903: California Landmarks League purchases the 2.5-acre (1 ha) fort property from George W. Call for $3,000.
- 1906: The fort is deeded to what becomes the California State Parks Commission.
- 1906, April 18: California's major historical earthquake causes considerable damage to the buildings of the fort compound.
- 1916: Fort Ross is partially restored.
- 1970: Fires at Fort Ross destroy the chapel and damage the roof of the Rotchev House.
- 1971: Fort Ross is once again only partially restored.
- 1974: Restored Fort Ross officially reopened.
- 1976–1979: CA 1 demolished the road in the middle of the fort.
- 2010: The Rotchev House is opened as a house museum
- 2010: Memorandum of Agreement signed in San Francisco between the State of California and Renova Group, a Russian entrepreneurial company, whereby the Russian company undertakes to fund the continuing upkeep and operation of Fort Ross.
- 2012, March 15: Bodega Bay (Port Rumiantsev) celebrates its 200th anniversary as the main port of Russian California.
- 2012, April: The Russian River at Jenner celebrates its 200th anniversary of being named Slavyanka by Ivan Kuskov
- 2012, August: an American delegation visits Tot'ma, Russia on its 875th anniversary and 200th anniversary of Fort Ross' founding by Ivan Kuskov, a Tot'ma native.
- 2012: Fort Ross State Historic Park celebrated the bicentennial of Russian settlement with a two-day event that was attended by over 6,500 people.
- 2012, September: The Kashaya expedition to Russia. An unofficial delegation from California was hosted in Russia marking the Kashaya's first ever trip to Russia.
- 2012, October: A working interpretation of the original windmill was built and dedicated at the park.

== Annual international conference on Russian–U.S. relations ==
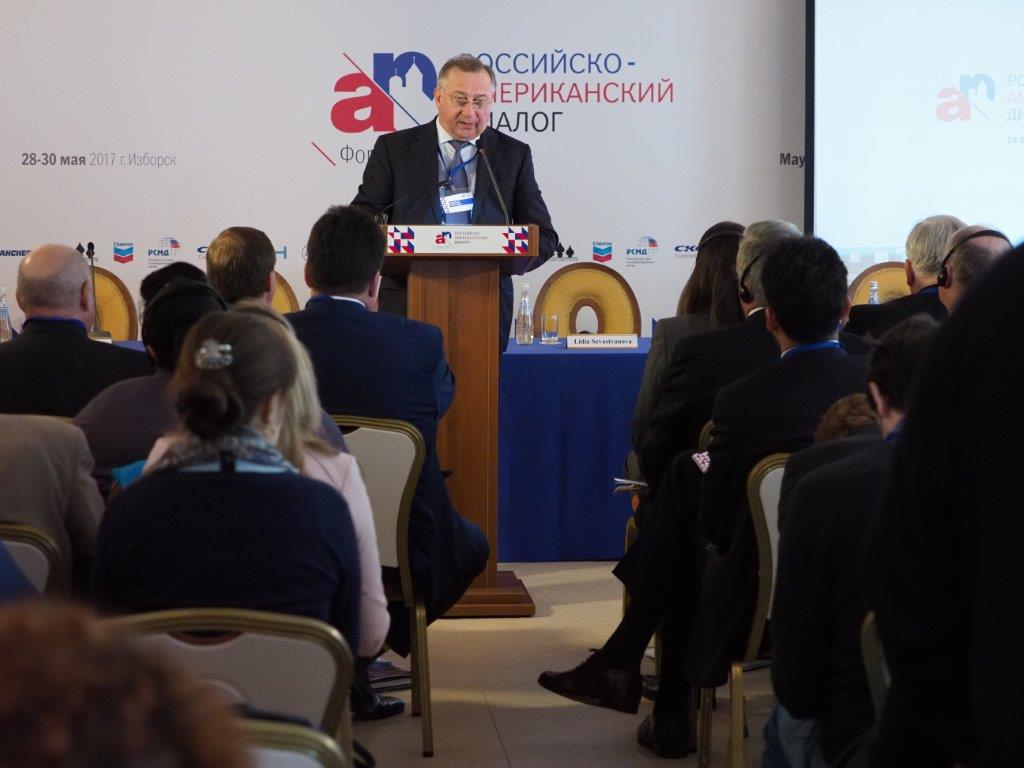
Transneft President Nikolay Tokarev

Since 2012, the Fort Ross Conservancy has been hosting the Fort Ross Dialogue annual international conference on US–Russian Relations and Fort Ross Festival, co-sponsored by Transneft, Chevron and Sovcomflot. The first Russia-based meeting within the framework of the Dialogue was held in Pskov (Russian Federation) on 29 and 30 May 2017. The first day of the Forum was marked by the panel discussion "Towards each other: Russian trailblazers and American pioneers: similarities and dissimilarities of Russian and US experience in arranging museum operations, financing structure, role of the state and private business in promoting cultural sites". On the second day, the forum participants representing business circles and the expert community of Russia and the U.S. reviewed the interaction potential between the two nations in energy industry at the panel discussion "The energy sector as an important element Russian and USA geopolitics".

== Buildings ==
Kuskov House, located in the mid-eastern area of the fort, was the residence of Ivan Kuskov and the other managers up to Alexander Rotchev.
Rotchev House, located in the northwest area of the fort, was where Alexander Rotchev, the last manager of Fort Ross, lived with his family. Built circa 1836, it is the only remaining original building.
Officials' Quarters, located in the mid-western area of the fort near the gate.
Two blockhouses stand at opposite corners of the stockade. The first one pictured here is at the northeast; the second at the southwest.
Today's Holy Trinity St. Nicholas Chapel, located at the southeast corner of the fort, is incorporated into the stockade. Different Russian Orthodox jurisdictions hold service in the reconstructed chapel three times a year (photo from a religious service during a Fourth of July San Francisco Russian community picnic in mid/late 1950s). Archbishop John (Shakhovskoy) of San Francisco and Western North America is the senior cleric in the picture (second from the right).

== Fort Ross State Historic Park ==
Fort Ross State Historic Park
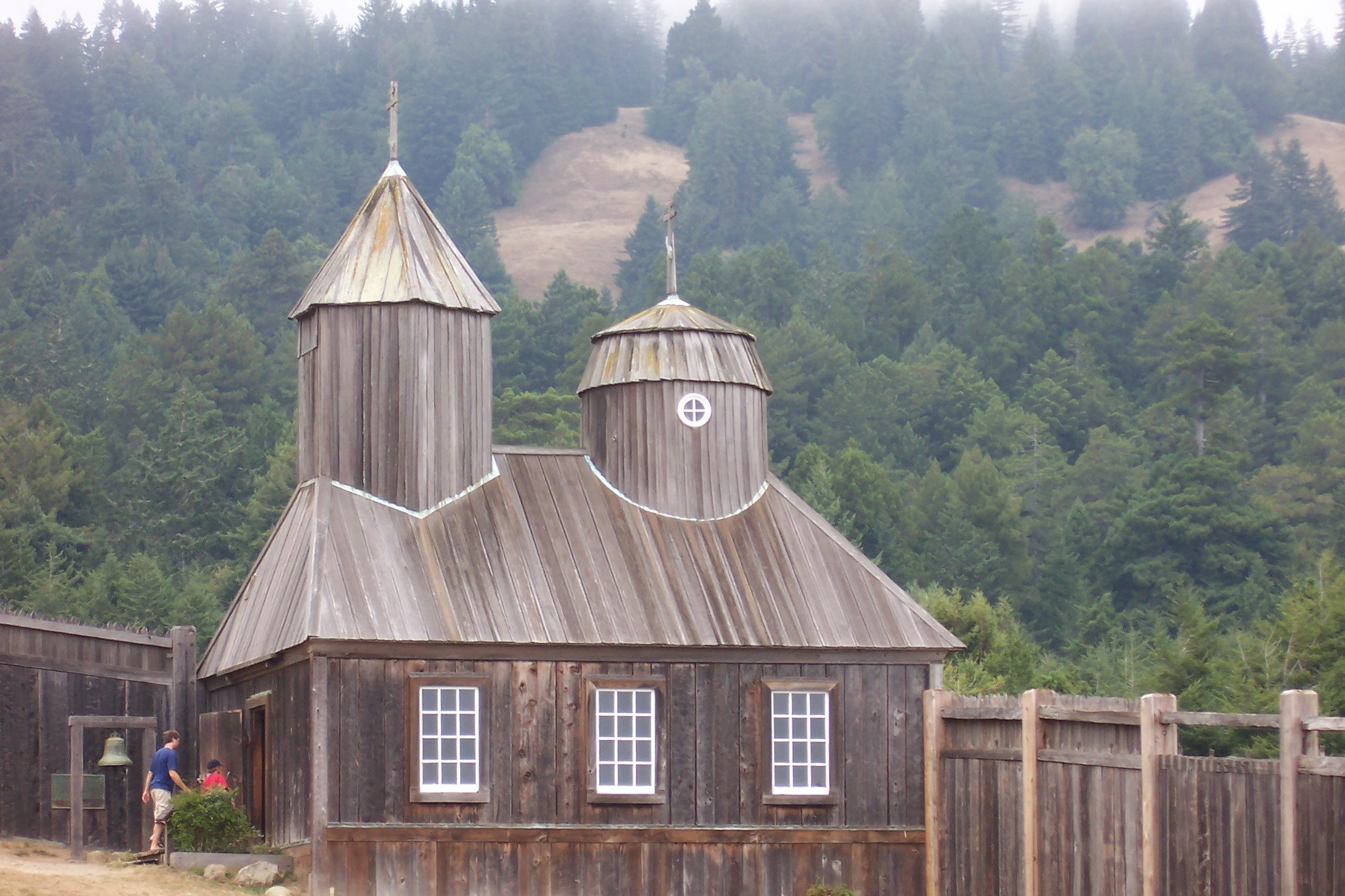
- The reconstructed chapel of Fort Ross

- Location within California Location within the United States
- Location: Sonoma County, California, United States
- Nearest city: Jenner, California
- Coordinates: 38°30′51″N 123°14′34″W
- Area: 3,393 acres (1,373 ha)
- Established: 1909
- Governing body: California Department of Parks and Recreation

The 3,393-acre (1,373 ha) Fort Ross State Historic Park was established in 1909. A 3,000-acre (1,200 ha) site was purchased in 1906 by the State of California, to preserve the archaeological remains of the area. Later, more land was purchased, and the park now includes some of the surrounding lands, which, although not originally part of the compound, still hold valuable archaeological evidence.

The park is located on the northern California coast about 12 miles north of the town of Jenner and 22 miles north of Bodega Bay. Fort Ross is located on the coast, meaning it is vulnerable to erosion and other natural processes, such as acidic soil, wildfires, and even the destruction of animals like gophers. The other possible disturbance comes from cultural processes; that is, humans and their actions. Harmful activities include illegal collecting and, more generally, the wear and tear that occurs simply from people visiting the site.

=== California State Landmark ===
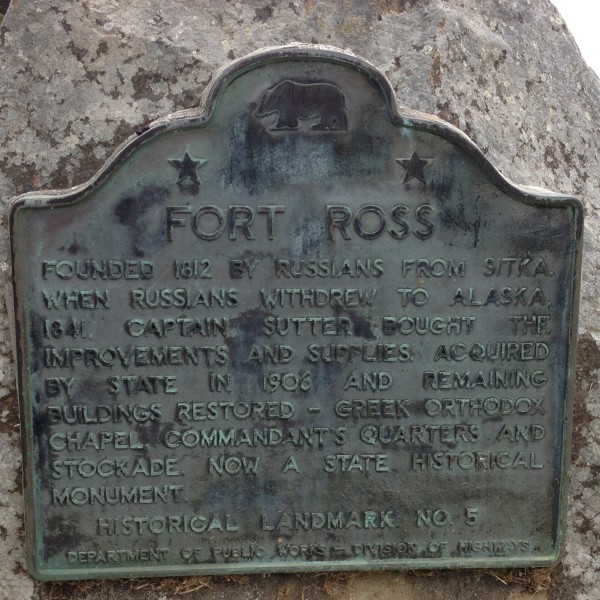
Plaque reading as follows: FORT ROSS Founded 1812 by Russians from Sitka. When Russians withdrew to Alaska, 1841, Captain Sutter bought the improvements and supplies. Acquired by State in 1906 and remaining buildings restored. Greek Orthodox chapel, commandant’s quarters and stockade now a state historical monument. Historical Landmark No. 5. Department of Public Works – Division of Highways

On June 1, 1932, Fort Ross was designated "California Historical Landmark #5". The site is a Sonoma County Historic Landmark.

=== Access and closures ===
In 2009 the park was under the risk of being closed due to state budget cuts. Russian ambassador Sergey Kislyak petitioned in favor of the park, but Governor Arnold Schwarzenegger promised nothing. On June 22, 2010, a memorandum of understanding between the Renova Group of Companies and the State of California, and between Renova Group and Fort Ross Conservancy (then the Fort Ross Interpretive Association) was signed in San Francisco in the presence of Russian President Dmitry Medvedev "to affirm a partnership to support and promote the preservation of California's Fort Ross State Historic Park, and to raise awareness of its historical and cultural significance." The threatened park closures were ultimately avoided by cutting hours and maintenance system-wide.

== Climate ==
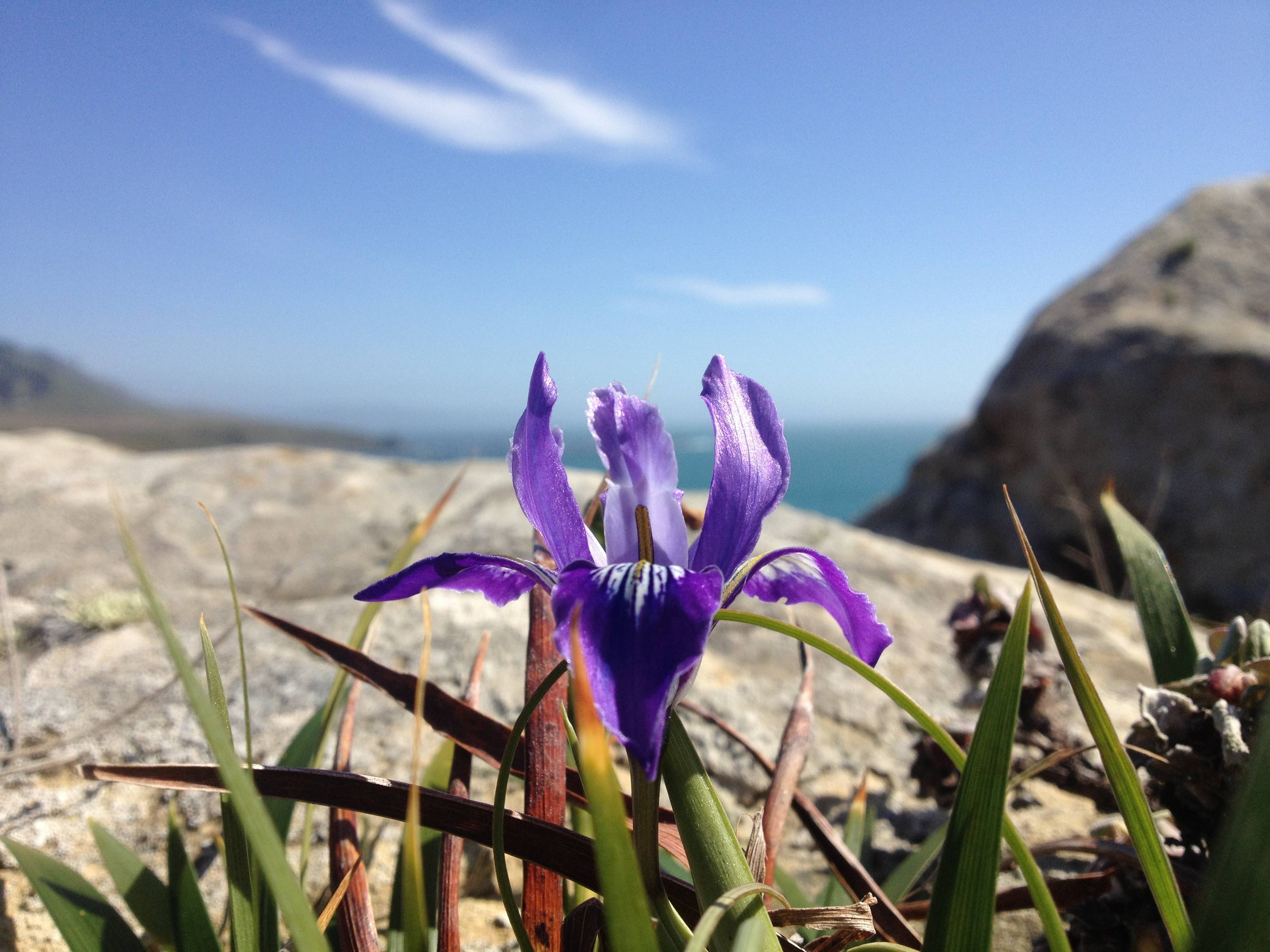
A purple variety of the Douglas iris is a common sight in the area surrounding Fort Ross.

The National Weather Service has maintained a cooperative weather station at Fort Ross for many years. Based on those observations, Fort Ross has cool, damp weather most of the year. Fog and low overcast is common throughout the year. There are occasional warm days in the summer, which also tend to be relatively dry except for drizzle from heavy fogs or passing showers. According to the Köppen climate classification system, Fort Ross has a warm-summer Mediterranean climate (Csb).

In January, average temperatures range from 57.0 °F (13.9 °C) to 41.5 °F (5.3 °C). In July, average temperatures range from 66.3 °F (19.1 °C) to 47.8 °F (8.8 °C). September is actually the warmest month with average temperatures ranging from 68.1 °F (20.1 °C) to 48.7 °F (9.3 °C). There are an average of only 0.2 days with highs of 90 °F (32 °C) or higher and 5.8 days with lows of 32 °F (0 °C) or lower. The record high temperature was 97 °F (36 °C) on September 3, 1950. The record low temperature was 20 °F (−7 °C) on December 8, 1972.

Average annual precipitation is 37.64 inches (956 mm), falling on an average of 81 days each year. The wettest year was 1983 with 71.27 inches (1.810 m) and the driest year was 1976 with 17.98 inches (457 mm). The wettest month on record was February 1998 with 21.68 inches (551 mm). The most rainfall in 24 hours was 5.70 inches (145 mm) on January 14, 1956. Snow rarely falls at Fort Ross; the record snowfall was 0.4-inch (10 mm) on December 30, 1987.

Climate data for Fort Ross (1991–2020 normals, extremes 1897–1908, 1950–present)
Month	Jan	Feb	Mar	Apr	May	Jun	Jul	Aug	Sep	Oct	Nov	Dec	Year
Record high °F (°C)	83 (28)	79 (26)	78 (26)	86 (30)	85 (29)	89 (32)	88 (31)	92 (33)	97 (36)	93 (34)	88 (31)	76 (24)	97 (36)
Mean daily maximum °F (°C)	56.8 (13.8)	58.5 (14.7)	58.7 (14.8)	60.3 (15.7)	62.4 (16.9)	65.9 (18.8)	65.5 (18.6)	66.8 (19.3)	67.2 (19.6)	66.4 (19.1)	60.9 (16.1)	57.2 (14.0)	62.2 (16.8)
Daily mean °F (°C)	49.2 (9.6)	50.3 (10.2)	50.4 (10.2)	51.5 (10.8)	53.5 (11.9)	56.1 (13.4)	57.0 (13.9)	58.1 (14.5)	57.8 (14.3)	56.8 (13.8)	52.6 (11.4)	49.4 (9.7)	53.6 (12.0)
Mean daily minimum °F (°C)	41.6 (5.3)	42.2 (5.7)	42.1 (5.6)	42.7 (5.9)	44.6 (7.0)	46.4 (8.0)	48.4 (9.1)	49.5 (9.7)	48.4 (9.1)	47.2 (8.4)	44.3 (6.8)	41.6 (5.3)	44.9 (7.2)
Record low °F (°C)	22 (−6)	20 (−7)	21 (−6)	26 (−3)	26 (−3)	31 (−1)	35 (2)	29 (−2)	30 (−1)	25 (−4)	24 (−4)	20 (−7)	20 (−7)
Average precipitation inches (mm)	8.48 (215)	6.81 (173)	5.38 (137)	2.72 (69)	1.39 (35)	0.58 (15)	0.08 (2.0)	0.15 (3.8)	0.63 (16)	2.39 (61)	5.17 (131)	6.83 (173)	40.62 (1,032)
Source: NOAA

== In popular culture ==
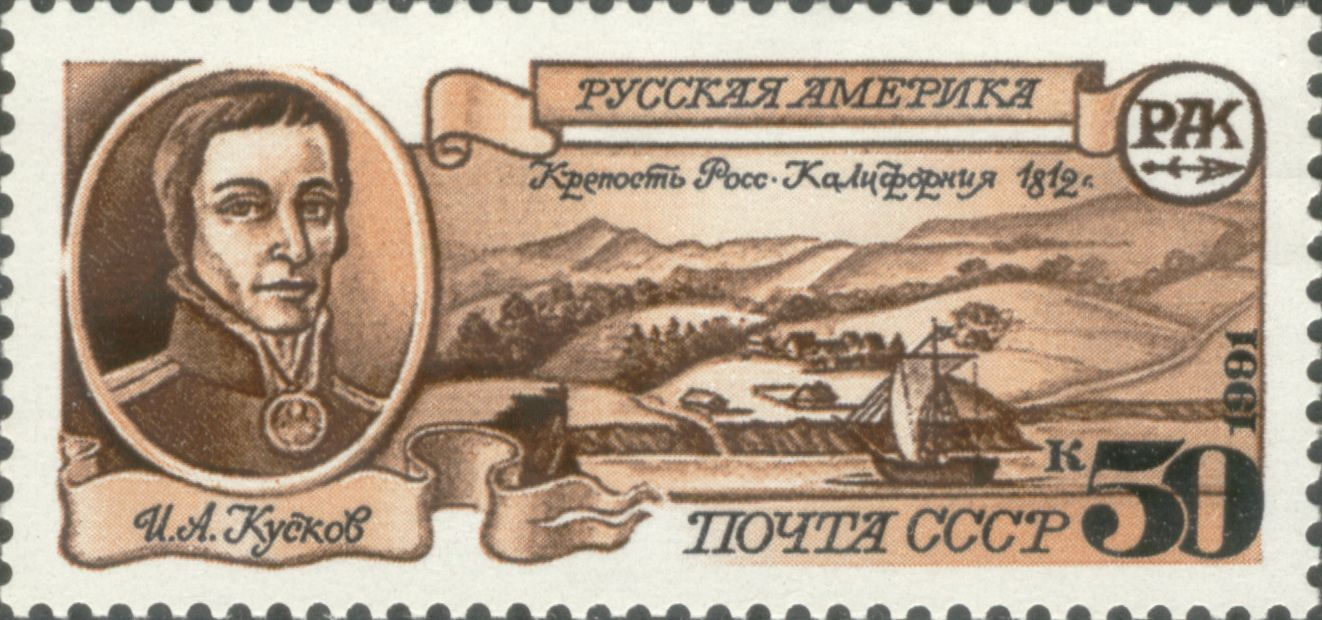
Soviet 1991 postage stamp showing Fort Ross with an image of Kuskov

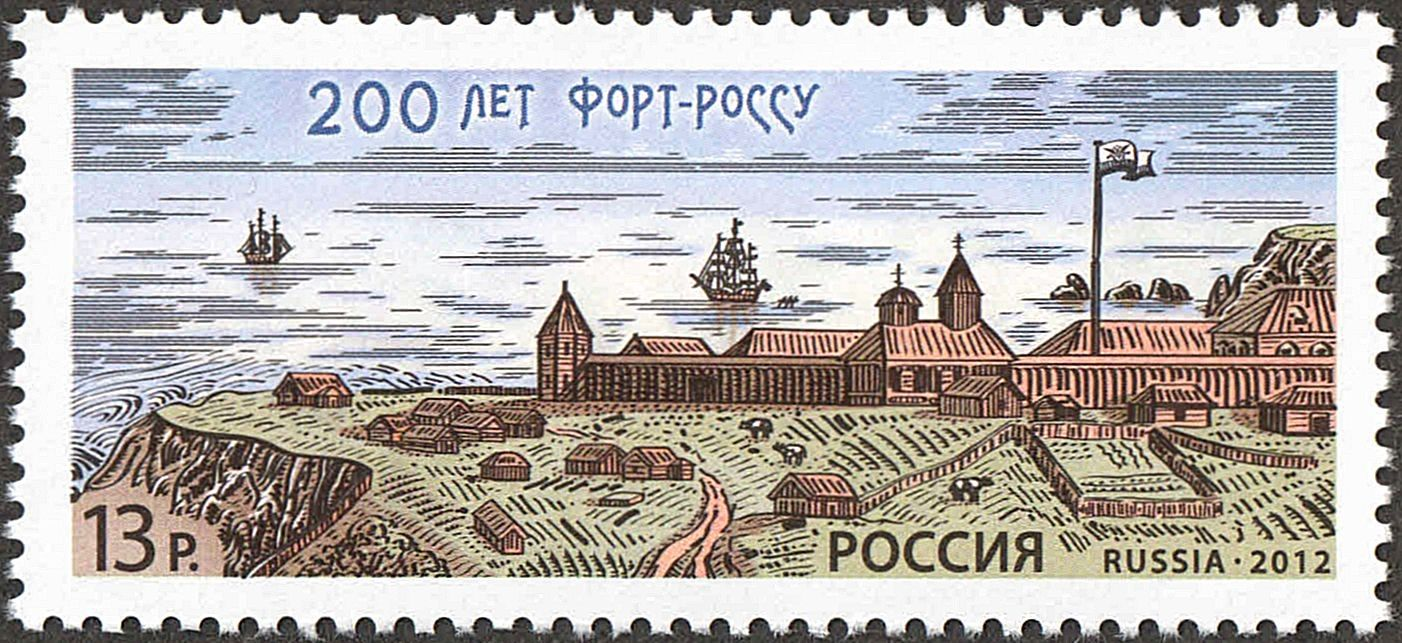
2012 Russian postage stamp showing Fort Ross

Fort Ross serves as the backdrop in the short story "Facts Relating to the Arrest of Dr. Kalugin," part of Kage Baker's series of science fiction stories concerning "The Company".

Fort Ross is featured in a 1991 episode of California's Gold with Huell Howser.

== See also ==
- California fur rush
- Russian America
- Russian Fort Elizabeth
- Russian-American Company flag
- Timofei Nikitich Tarakanov
- List of beaches in Sonoma County, California
- List of California state parks
- List of Sonoma County Regional Parks facilities
- National Register of Historic Places listings in Sonoma County, California
- List of National Historic Landmarks in California
