= Voznesensky (surname) =

Voznesensky (masculine), Voznesenskaya (feminine) is a Russian clerical surname derived from Vozneseniye, or Ascension, either from the Feast of the Ascension or from any of Ascension churches or monasteries.

- Alexander Voznesensky (1898–1950), Soviet economist
- Anastasiya Voznesenskaya, Soviet actress, wife of Andrey Myagkov
- Andrei Voznesensky (1933–2010), Russian poet and writer
- Igor Voznesensky (born 1985), Russian soccer player
- Ilya G. Voznesensky (1816–1871), Russian explorer and naturalist
- Julia Voznesenskaya (1940–2015), author of books with Orthodox Christian view
- Nikolai Voznesensky (1903–1950), Soviet economic planner
- Philaret (Voznesensky) (1903–1985), first hierarch of the Russian Orthodox Church Outside Russia
