= Juan B. R. Cooper =

American pioneer (1791–1872)

Juan Bautista Rogers Cooper
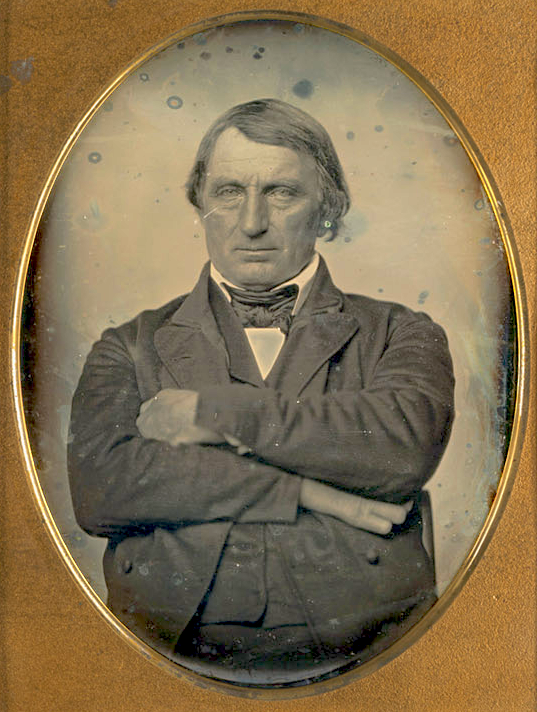
- John B. R. Cooper in 1850
- Born: John Rogers Cooper; September 11, 1791; Alderney, Guernsey, UK
- Died: June 2, 1872 (aged 80); San Francisco, California, US
- Resting place: St. Mary's Cathedral, San Francisco, California
- Other name: John Rogers Cooper
- Citizenship: British, Mexican
- Occupations: Sea captain, trader, merchant, rancher, landowner
- Years active: 1832–1870
- Known for: Early Monterey, California pioneer
- Spouse: Maria Jerónima de la Encarnación Vallejo (m. 1827; died 1872)
- Children: Ana Maria Guadalupe; Henry Baptiste Guillermo; Juan Bautista Guillermo; William Rogers; Amelia; Guadalupe Francisca; George Howard Vallejo
- Parent(s): Thomas Cooper and Elizabeth Anne Rogers Larkin
- Relatives: Thomas Larkin

Juan Bautista Rogers Cooper (born John Rogers Cooper; September 11, 1791 – June 2, 1872) was a 19th-century pioneer of California, who held British, Mexican, and finally American citizenship. Raised in Massachusetts in a maritime family, he came to the Mexican territory of Alta California as master of the ship Rover, and was a pioneer of Monterey, California, when it was the capital of the territory. He converted to Catholicism, became a Mexican citizen, and acquired extensive land holdings in the area prior to the Mexican–American War.

== Early life ==
John Rogers Cooper was born on the island of Alderney, Guernsey, in the British Channel Islands, son of Thomas Cooper and Anne Rogers. His father, from Christchurch, Hampshire, England was lost at sea with his ship when John was 8 years old. His mother and John relocated to Boston, Massachusetts when he was a boy. His mother married Thomas Larkin, whose son and John's half-brother Thomas O. Larkin became a prominent businessman and the United States' first and only consul to Mexican Alta California.

After moving to Boston with his mother, he traveled extensively, first attending school in Charleston and then serving as second mate on a missionary trip to the Hawaiian Islands. He arrived in Monterey, Alta California as master of his own vessel, the trading schooner Rover, in 1823.

== Life in Monterey ==
Upon his arrival in Monterey, Cooper sold the Rover to the government of newly independent Mexico, which as yet had no ships on the Pacific Coast with which to maintain contact with Alta California. To help cash-poor California governor Luis Arguello pay him for the ship, Cooper agreed to stay on as captain and enter the lucrative China trade, twice carrying Californian and Hawaiian goods to Canton and returning with Chinese goods. Cooper and Arguello quarreled, however, over how to split the profits, and it was many years before Cooper received payment. Collection was made more difficult when Arguello left office in 1825. In 1826, the Rover was sent south under a new captain, and never returned to Monterey.

He boarded with the family of Ignacio Vicente Ferrer Vallejo, a prominent family of Castillean descent. Cooper drew on his knowledge of trade to open a general merchandise store in Monterey. In 1827 at age 36, Cooper proposed to Vallejo's 18-year-old daughter Maria Jerónima de la Encarnación Vallejo. To marry her, Cooper was baptized as a Roman Catholic. He adopted the baptismal name of Juan Bautista Rogers Cooper. His padrino (sponsor) was William Hartnell, an Englishman who had been a trader and living in Monterey since 1822. Cooper and Vallejo were married on August 24, 1827 at San Carlos Mission. Her brother Mariano Guadalupe Vallejo later became an influential Californio general, statesman, and public figure.

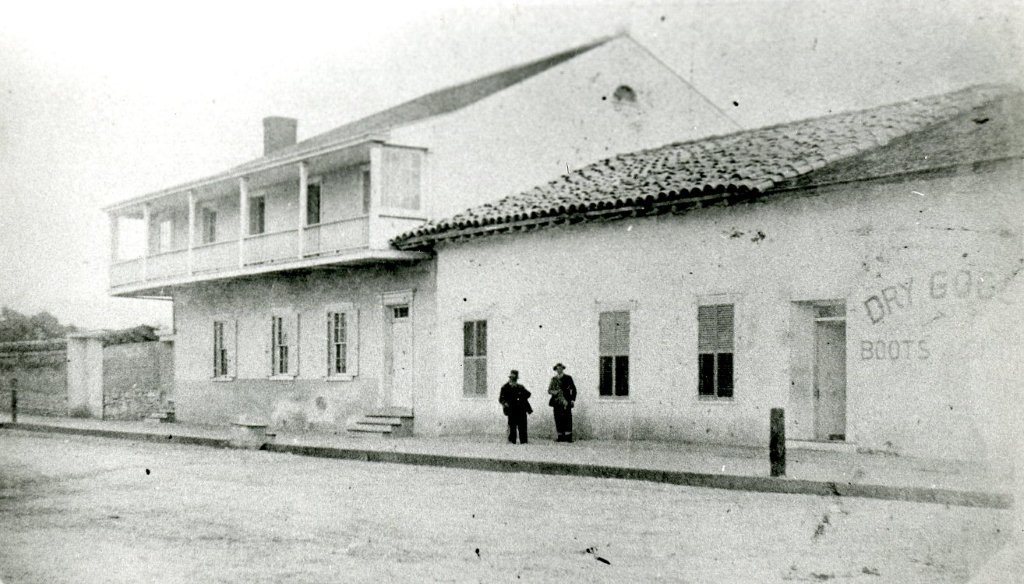
The Cooper-Molera Adobe in 1880

Cooper built a home in downtown Monterey, later known as the Cooper-Molera Adobe. Naturalization was not strictly required until 1829 when a law was passed requiring permanent residents to be Mexican citizens. Both Cooper and Hartnell were naturalized in 1830. Along with conversion to Catholicism and marriage into a prominent family, naturalization helped Cooper become accepted in Monterey and obtain land grants.

Cooper saw enormous possibilities for growth in California, and persuaded his half-brother Thomas O. Larkin to relocate from the eastern United States in 1832 to assist him in his business pursuits. Cooper worked tirelessly with Larkin to strengthen trade with China, England, the U.S., and South America and later help California join the union.

Cooper made a number of trips from 1839 to 1844 to the Mexican coast and to the Hawaiian Islands in command of the government-owned Californian, which carried mail, prisoners, and government officials from Monterey to Mexico. In 1846 he made a voyage to Peru and in 1849 he was master of the Eveline on a trading trip to China. During her husband's long absences on business, she raised their children and managed the family's affairs.

=== Assists Jedediah Smith ===
Because Monterey was the territorial capital and port of entry, anyone entering Alta California had to come to Monterey to get official permission to remain. In 1827, Cooper hosted and escorted trapper/explorer Jedediah Smith, the first U.S. citizen to travel to California overland. Cooper helped Smith obtain a passport so his party could continue north into Oregon.

== Obtains land grants ==
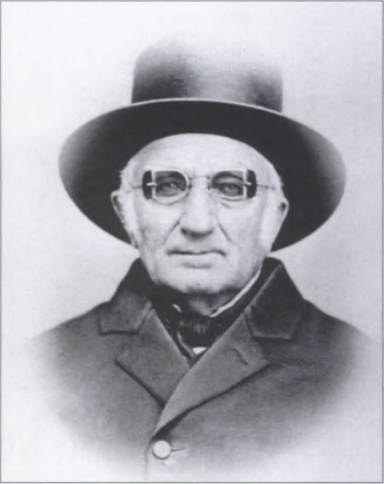
John Cooper in 1870.

=== Rancho El Molino ===
Governor José Figueroa was interested in countering the Russian presence at Fort Ross in Northern California. Between 1824 and 1836 the Mexicans found during every exploratory effort north of present-day San Rafael and west of Sonoma increasing evidence of Russian presence. They discovered at least three Russian farms that had been established inland from Ft. Ross.

To block the gradual encroachment of the Russians, the Mexican officials granted land to almost anyone who qualified. In 1833, Figueroa granted Cooper Rancho El Molino (about 17,892-acre (72.41 km^{2})) in present-day Sonoma County, California. The grant was confirmed by Governor Nicolás Gutiérrez in 1836. Cooper constructed a water-powered commercial sawmill on the land in 1834. As required by the Land Act of 1851, Cooper filed a claim for Rancho El Molino with the Public Land Commission in 1852, and he received the legal patent in 1853.

=== Rancho Bolsa del Potrero y Moro Cojo ===
In October 1829, Cooper bought 7,000 acres (2,800 ha) of Rancho Bolsa del Potrero y Moro Cojo from Joaquín de la Torre for $2,000. (equivalent to $66,000 in 2024 dollars). The rancho was located between the Tembladero Slough and present-day Castroville. Cooper filed a claim with the Public Land Commission on March 30, 1852, and received the patent on December 19, 1859.

=== Rancho El Sur ===
Juan Bautista Alvarado, a nephew of Cooper's wife Encarnacion, filed a claim for Rancho El Sur on May 14, 1834 in which he stated that he had first petitioned for a provisional grant on August 12, 1830, and repeated his petition on February 26, 1831. During 1831, he maintained "more than three hundred head of large cattle and nearly an [sic] hundred horses, all my own property, and have built a house and pens" on Rancho El Sur. The Rancho totalled two leagues of land, or roughly 8,880 acres (3,590 ha).

Cooper was apparently involved in managing the ranch as early as 1834, when he contracted with Job Dye to raise mules on Rancho El Sur. In the same year Governor Jose Figueroa granted Cooper possession of the Rancho. But Cooper did not receive legal possession until 1840.

In 1840, Alvarado traded ownership of Rancho El Sur to Cooper in exchange for the more accessible and readily farmed 22,000-acre (89.03 km^{2}) Rancho Bolsa del Potrero y Moro Cojo north of present-day Castroville in the Salinas Valley. (Alvarado later sold Rancho Bolsa del Potrero y Moro Cojo back to Cooper.)

Alvarado also granted Cooper Rancho Punta de Quentin in present-day Marin County. Cooper built a mansion on the point which later became the site of San Quentin State Prison. In 1844, Governor Manuel Micheltorena granted Cooper and Pablo de la Guerra Rancho Nicasio, also in Marin County. Cooper sold his interests in both Marin County ranchos in 1850.

The Cooper family ran a cattle ranch and dairy operation on Rancho El Sur, employing Hispanic and Indian vaqueros. They supported the Sur School and a community center.

== Later years ==
On March 12, 1871, John B.R. Cooper's 40 year old son John B.H. Cooper married 18 year old Martha Brawley, a cousin (once removed) of Abraham Lincoln, at the San Carlos Cathedral.

Cooper lived with his family in Monterey in the Cooper adobe. He was appointed in 1851 to the post of Monterey Harbormaster. Their daughter Ana Maria de Guadalupe married Herman Wohler in 1859. He was a German who had come to California in 1848. Their daughter Amelia married Eusebio Joseph Molera, a graduate of the Royal Academy of Engineering in Spain and the first person to obtain a patent for propelling vehicles by use of a storage battery, in 1875. In 1864 he and his wife moved to San Francisco where they built a home at 821 Bush St.

After John B.R. Cooper's death in 1872, the ranch was divided into four parts: son John B.H. Cooper received the northernmost section. John B.R. Cooper's widow Maria Encarnación Vallejo received section two of the land. Their two surviving daughters, Anna Maria de Guadalupe Cooper and Francisca Guadalupe Amelia Cooper, received sections three and four.

== Cooper Ranch ==
The son John B. H. Cooper built a new home on his portion of Rancho El Sur Ranch but died on June 21, 1899, before he could move in. His wife Martha received 2,591 acres (1,049 ha) of her husband's estate, which totaled about 10,000 acres (4,000 ha), and over time she bought the remainder from her husband's two sisters. Martha ran a successful cattle and dairy operation.

Martha remarried in about 1918 to James Joseph Hughes of San Francisco. In 1928 she sold 5,000 acres (2,000 ha) of the ranch for about $500,000 to businessman Harry Cole Hunt and his wife Jane Selby (née Hayne) of Carmel-by-the-Sea. He had been president of the Tide Water Oil Company and a director of Dabney and Hogan Petroleum Companies. On November 28, 1931, he announced that he had arranged to lease the remaining 5,000 acres (2,000 ha) from her.

Martha died on May 23, 1940, in Monterey, California. Funeral services were held the Royal Presidio Chapel in Monterey at San Carlos Church.

== Legacy ==
=== Cooper cabin ===
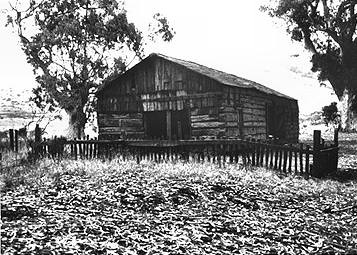
The Cooper Cabin in Big Sur in 1888

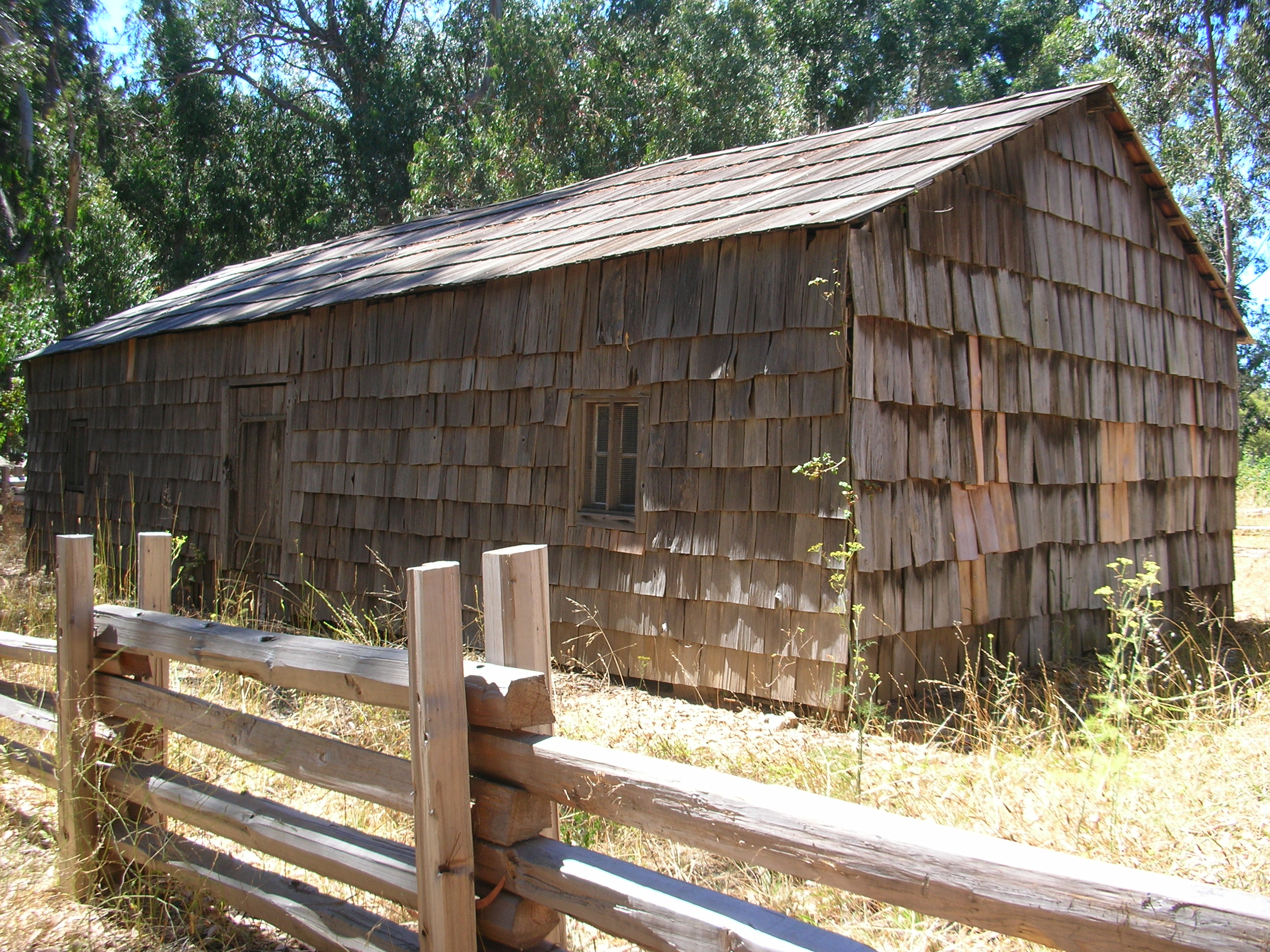
The Cooper Cabin in 2010

Cooper contracted on February 23, 1861, with George Austin for a house to be built on the "Sud Ranch". The ranch was referred to by that name on the diseño, a pen-and-ink and pencil map on tracing paper documenting the ranch for the Public Land Commission. Austin was a native of Massachusetts who came to California in 1847 as a midshipman on the Independence. He had a long record of employment with Cooper. He served as a chairman on the U.S. Surveyor General's 1860 survey of the rancho and later was employed as caretaker of Cooper's Monterey home, the Cooper-Molera Adobe. The use of lap jointed corners is common to the New England states, but is quite rare in the west. Austin's 1861 contract called for him to build a "block house" 46 feet long and 20 feet wide. It was to have three rooms, "the middle room to be one window to each room on the front and back of the house - and 2 doors - one at the front and one at the back of the middle room."

An expert forester took samples of five of the cabin's logs for tree-ring dating, using an increment borer, and took rubbings of exposed log ends. He documented a chronology of wet and dry weather cycles gathered from samples of living redwoods in the area. Based on this research, he was able to establish that the logs were originally harvested in the spring of 1861, probably during the months of April and May, within two months of the signing of the contract between Cooper and George Austin. He concluded the cabin was built in April or May 1861, confirming it as the oldest surviving structure in Big Sur. It is preserved within Pfeiffer Big Sur State Park.

=== Captain Cooper School ===
J.B. Cooper built a schoolhouse and community center on the Cooper Ranch in the 1850s. Big Sur pioneer Sam Trotter wrote about attending the "big dance Saturday night at the Cooper hall near the mouth of Big Sur [River] on the Cooper grant." The Sur schoolhouse was followed by the county-owned Pfeiffer School within what is now Pfeiffer Big Sur State Park which opened on October 20, 1916.

Community members appealed to the Carmel Unified School District for a new school in the 1950s, but they refused to pay for the construction. Frances Molera, the granddaughter of John Cooper, donated land for the new school in 1961. She stipulated that the school should be named after her grandfather. The Captain Cooper School was built by community members without assistance from the Carmel Unified School District and completed in 1962. The district then assumed management.

A mural at the school was funded by members of the School Site Council in 1999 that depicts the Big Sur Coast in the 1820s. In that year, Captain John Baptista Rogers Cooper saw Big Sur for the first time when he brought his schooner, the Rover, to the mouth of the Big Sur River. The mural portrays the area that became Rancho El Sur and the volcanic rock that is the site of Point Sur Lighthouse.

=== Cooper Molera Adobe ===
Cooper built a home in Monterey in 1827. He became a prosperous business and land owner. While buying other properties, Cooper was unable to pay some debt, and sold half of his land to John Coffin Jones. He in turn sold part of his portion of the site to his clerk Nathan Spear, who built a warehouse on the property. Spear sold part of his property to Manuel Diaz, a prosperous storekeeper and politician, who operated a corner store.

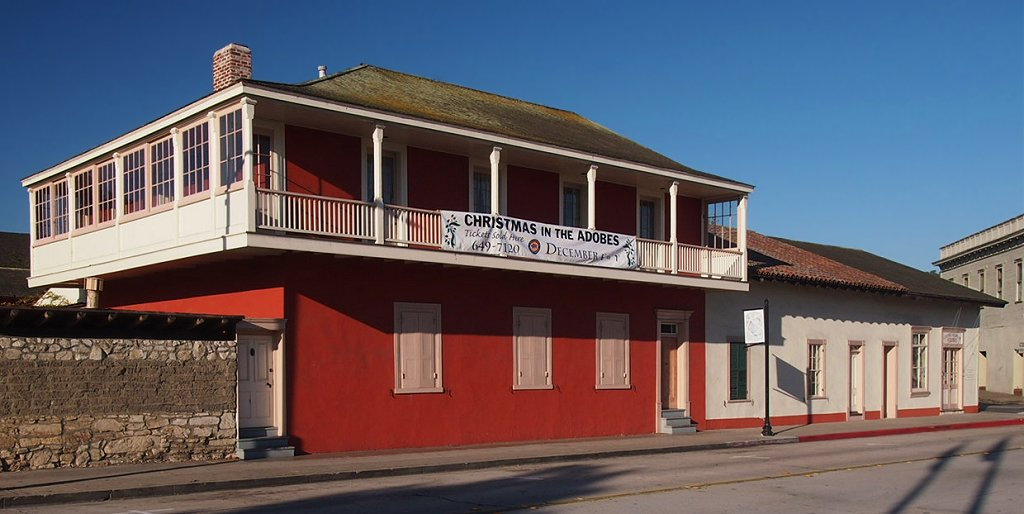
The Cooper-Molera Adobe in 2013 when operated by the California State Parks.

Cooper's fortunes increased when California gained statehood. In 1850 he built a second story on his half of the adobe and deeded the home to his wife Encarnacion in 1852. After Cooper's death in 1872, Cooper's eldest daughter Anita inherited the house. She bought the portion of the building her father had sold.

Their daughter Francisca Amelia married Eusebio Joseph Molera in 1875. When she died in September 1918, she left an estate valued at $300,000 to her son Andrew and daughter Frances. They lived at the property part-time while their main home was in San Francisco. Andrew built a barn on the property to keep racehorses. When Frances died in 1968, she willed the Cooper Molera Adobe to the National Trust for Historic Preservation. They leased the park to California State Parks in 1972, which restored the property to its pre-1900 configuration and opened it to the public in 1984. It became part of the Monterey State Historic Park. The property contains structures that were built both before and after the main house, reflecting California's Spanish and New England architectural history.

In 2018, the Trust reassumed management of the site and completed additional restoration work. They negotiated with the community stakeholders and formalized a plan to open a cafe, gift store, and events center to fund the site. They also offer offered interpretive programs and tours. The property in downtown Monterey on 2.7 acres (1.1 ha) includes gardens and the original barn. It is recognized as a leading example of Spanish building style combined with New England architecture reflecting Monterey's history from 1823 to 1900. The renovation was awarded the 2019 Preservation Design Award for Rehabilitation.

=== Cooper's Sawmill ===
Cooper's Sawmill is a California Historical Landmark located about 2 miles (3.2 km) north of Forestville, California. It was the first water power-operated sawmill used for commercial purposes in California. The mill processed primarily Redwood trees. Its power came from Mark West Creek. The sawmill was destroyed by a flood in early 1841.
