= Rancho El Molino =

Coordinates: 38.480°N 122.870°W

Rancho El Molino was a 17,892-acre (72.41 km^{2}) Mexican land grant in present-day Sonoma County, California granted by Governor José Figueroa in 1833 to John B.R. Cooper. The grant was officially confirmed by Governor Nicolás Gutiérrez in 1836. "Molino" means "mill" in Spanish, and the name refers to Cooper's sawmill. The grant extends south from Russian River along Atascadero Creek, and encompasses present-day Forestville.

== History ==
Captain John Bautista Rogers Cooper married General Vallejo’s sister Encarnacion in 1827. At the direction of Governor Figueroa in 1835, General Vallejo began construction of the Presidio of Sonoma to counter the Russian presence at Fort Ross. To extend the settlements in the direction of Fort Ross, Cooper was granted Rancho El Molino in 1833. Cooper constructed a water power-operated commercial sawmill in 1834. Cooper also provided recommendations to Vallejo for grantees for the nearby Rancho Cañada de Jonive, Rancho Cañada de Pogolimi, and Rancho Estero Americano.

With the cession of California to the United States following the Mexican-American War, the 1848 Treaty of Guadalupe Hidalgo provided that the land grants would be honored. As required by the Land Act of 1851, Cooper filed a claim for Rancho El Molino with the Public Land Commission in 1852, and he received the legal patent in 1853.

Cooper’s daughter Ana Maria married German Hermann Wohler in 1856. Herman Wohler came to California in 1848 and became active in real estate. He served one term in the California State Legislature of 1855. Cooper gave the newlyweds 1,320 acres (5.3 km^{2}) near Forestville. Herman later opened an office in San Francisco from which he managed his properties, including farm lands in Sonoma County. After Hermann Wohler's death in 1877, the central 1,320 acres (5.3 km^{2}) were sold to Raford Peterson and his partner Charles Farmer, whom Peterson later bought out.

When Captain Cooper died in 1872, he left a large landed estate to his wife, Maria G. Encarnacion Vallejo Cooper, his son J.B. Henry Cooper, his two daughters Ana Maria Wohler and Amalia Molera, and his friend G.H. Howard. He directed the sale of his share of Rancho El Molino to pay his debts.

== Historic sites of the Rancho ==
Cooper's Sawmill was constructed in 1834 and destroyed by floods in the winter of 1840-41. It was the first water power-operated sawmill used for commercial purposes in the state of California. Redwood lumber was the primary wood used at the sawmill. Its power came from Mark West Creek. The sawmill was destroyed by a flood in early 1841.
