= Cooper's Sawmill =

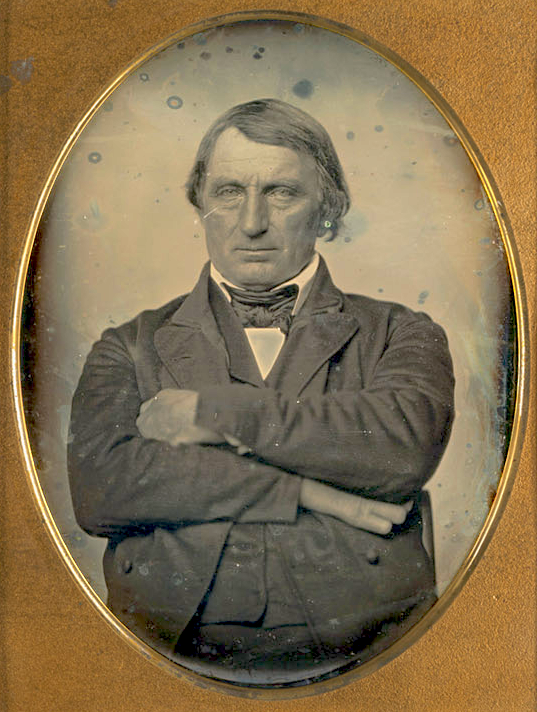
- John Bautista Rogers Cooper

- Location within California Location within the United States
- 38°29′36″N 122°53′45″W
- Location: Sonoma County

History
- Built: 1834

Site notes
- Architect: John B. R. Cooper

California Historical Landmark
- Official name: Cooper's Sawmill
- Designated: November 3, 1969
- Reference no.: 835

Cooper's Sawmill is a California Historical Landmark located almost two miles north of Forestville, California, and is located in the jurisdiction of Santa Rosa, in the United States. It was the site of the first power-operated sawmill used for commercial purposes in California.

== History ==
Cooper's Sawmill was built in 1834 by John B. R. Cooper. It was located on Rancho El Molino. Cooper built the mill approximately two years before he received a grant to Rancho El Molino. It became the first water power-operated sawmill used for commercial purposes in the state of California. Redwood lumber was the primary wood used at the sawmill. Its power came from Mark West Creek. In early 1841, the sawmill was destroyed by a flood.

=== California Historical Landmark ===
On November 3, 1969, Cooper's Sawmill was designated a California Historical Landmark.
