= Voznesensky, Nurimanovsky District, Republic of Bashkortostan =

Voznesensky Вознесенский
- Village
- Location within Bashkortostan Location within Russia
- Coordinates: 55°11′N 56°52′E
- Country: Russia
- Region: Bashkortostan
- District: Nurimanovsky District
- Time zone: UTC+5:00

Voznesensky (Russian: Вознесенский) is a rural locality (a village) in Nikolsky Selsoviet, Nurimanovsky District, Bashkortostan, Russia. The population was 37 as of 2010. There is 1 street.

== Geography ==
Voznesensky is located 14 km east of Krasnaya Gorka (the district's administrative centre) by road. Nikolskoye is the nearest rural locality.
