= Voznesenskoye, Arkhangelsk Oblast =

Voznesenskoye Вознесенское
- Selo
- Location within Arkhangelsk Oblast Location within Russia
- Coordinates: 62°20′N 44°12′E
- Country: Russia
- Region: Arkhangelsk Oblast
- District: Verkhnetoyemsky District
- Time zone: UTC+3:00

Voznesenskoye (Russian: Вознесенское) is a rural locality (a selo) in Verkhnetoyemsky District, Arkhangelsk Oblast, Russia. The population was 405 as of 2010. There are 2 streets.

== Geography ==
Voznesenskoye is located 56 km west of Verkhnyaya Toyma (the district's administrative centre) by road. Ostanskaya is the nearest rural locality.
