= Voznesensky, Zilairsky District, Republic of Bashkortostan =

Voznesensky Вознесенский
- Khutor
- Location within Bashkortostan Location within Russia
- Coordinates: 52°16′N 57°55′E
- Country: Russia
- Region: Bashkortostan
- District: Zilairsky District
- Time zone: UTC+5:00

Voznesensky (Russian: Вознесенский) is a rural locality (a khutor) in Yuldybayevsky Selsoviet, Zilairsky District, Bashkortostan, Russia. The population was 17 as of 2010. There is 1 street.

== Geography ==
Voznesensky is located 61 km east of Zilair (the district's administrative centre) by road. Yaparsaz is the nearest rural locality.
