= Voznesensky, Voronezh Oblast =

Voznesensky Вознесенский
- Settlement
- Location within Voronezh Oblast Location within Russia
- Coordinates: 51°04′N 40°40′E
- Country: Russia
- Region: Voronezh Oblast
- District: Talovsky District
- Time zone: UTC+3:00

Voznesensky (Russian: Вознесенский) is a rural locality (a settlement) and the administrative center of Voznesenskoye Rural Settlement, Talovsky District, Voronezh Oblast, Russia. The population was 587 as of 2010. There are 3 streets.

== Geography ==
Voznesensky is located 10 km southwest of Talovaya (the district's administrative centre) by road. Vysoky is the nearest rural locality.
