= Voznesenskoye, Voznesensky District, Nizhny Novgorod Oblast =

Voznesenskoye Вознесенское
- Urban-type settlement
- Interactive map of Voznesenskoye
- Location of Voznesenskoye Voznesenskoye (Nizhny Novgorod Oblast)
- Coordinates: 54.8911°N 42.7591°E
- Country: Russia
- Federal subject: Nizhny Novgorod Oblast
- Administrative district: Voznesensky District

Population (2010 Census)
  - Total: 6,777
  - Estimate (1910s): 3,200 (−52.8%)
- Time zone: UTC+3 (MSK)
- Postal code: 607340
- OKTMO ID: 22619151051

Voznesenskoye (Russian: Вознесе́нское) is an urban locality (an urban-type settlement) in Voznesensky District of Nizhny Novgorod Oblast, Russia. Population: 6,777 (2010 census); 7,328 (2002 census); 6,766 (1989 Soviet census).
