= Ilya Voznesensky =

Russian explorer and naturalist (1816–1871)

Ilya G. Voznesensky
- Илья́ Гаври́лович Вознесе́нский
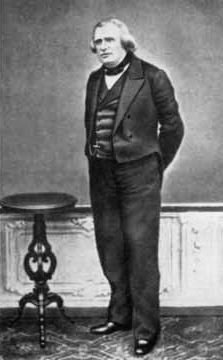
- Born: June 19, 1816; Saint Petersburg
- Died: May 18, 1871 (aged 54)

Ilya Gavrilovich Voznesensky (Russian: Илья́ Гаври́лович Вознесе́нский, also romanized as Ilia or Il'ia Voznesenskii or Wosnesenski; June 19, 1816 – May 18, 1871) was a Russian explorer and naturalist associated with the Russian Academy of Sciences who collected biological specimens and cultural artifacts from the Russian Far East and North and South America, known especially for his ten-year expedition in Russian America (parts of present-day Alaska and California), which he explored from 1839 to 1849. The expedition collected around 400 previously unknown species of plant and animals, and established the world's largest collection of ethnological artifacts of Russian America. After the expedition, Voznesensky was appointed custodian of the Zoological Museum in St. Petersburg. Voznesensky was a corresponding member of the Russian Geographical Society and one of the founders of the Russian Entomological Society. He was awarded the Order of Saint Stanislaus, third class, in 1856.
