= Voznesensky District =

Voznesensky District Вознесенский район (Russian)
- District
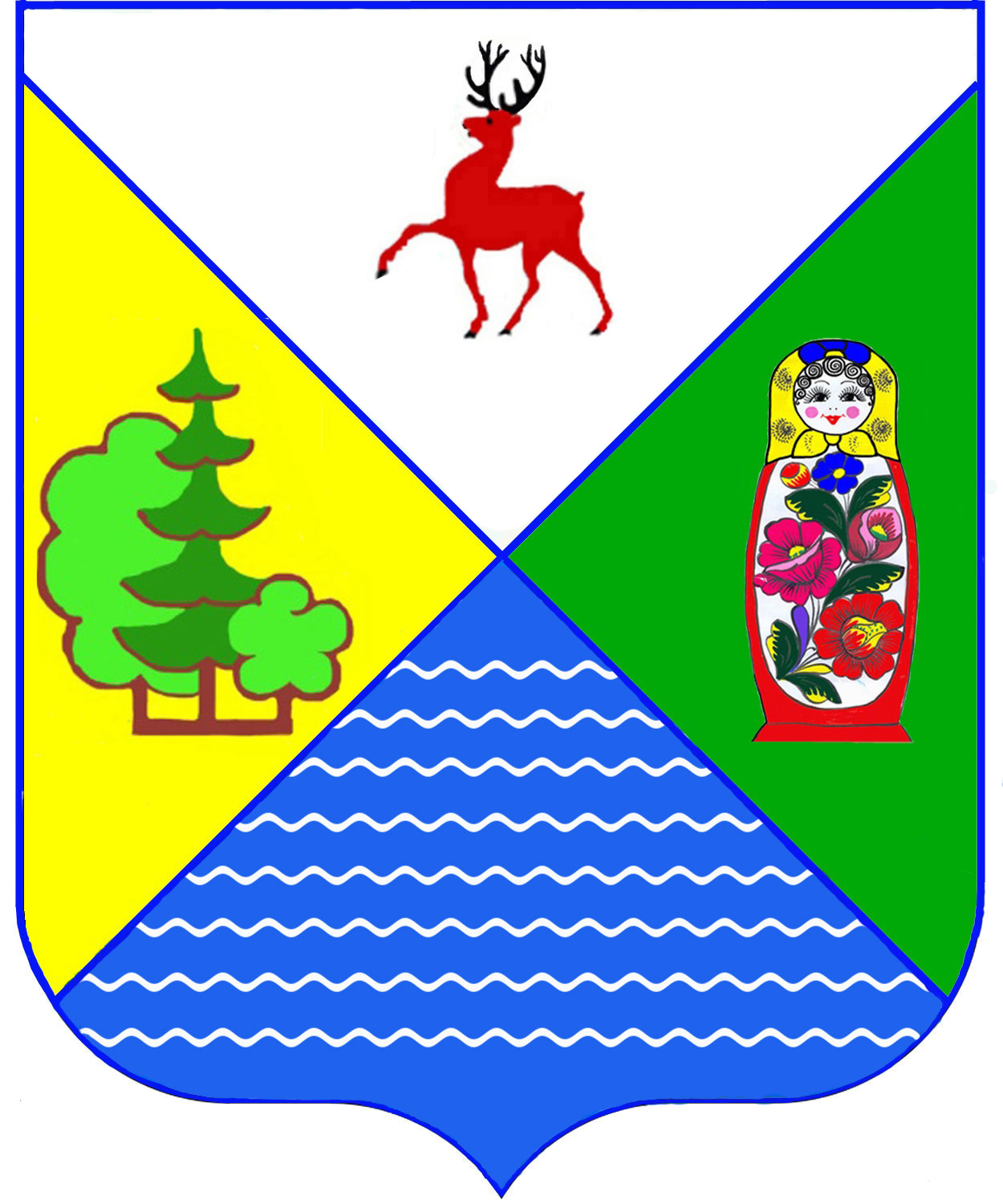
- Coat of arms
- Location of Voznesensky District in Nizhny Novgorod Oblast
- Coordinates: 54°53′30″N 42°46′30″E
- Country: Russia
- Federal subject: Nizhny Novgorod Oblast
- Established: 1929
- Administrative center: Voznesenskoye

Area
  - Total: 1,302.9 km^{2} (503.1 sq mi)

Population (2010 Census)
  - Total: 17,352
  - Density: 13.318/km^{2} (34.493/sq mi)
  - Urban: 39.1%
  - Rural: 60.9%

Administrative structure
  - Administrative divisions: 1 Work settlements, 8 Selsoviets
  - Inhabited localities: 1 urban-type settlements, 59 rural localities

Municipal structure
  - Municipally incorporated as: Voznesensky Municipal District
  - Municipal divisions: 1 urban settlements, 8 rural settlements
- Time zone: UTC+3 (MSK)
- OKTMO ID: 22619000
- Website: http://www.voznesenskoe.ru

Voznesensky District (Russian: Вознесе́нский райо́н) is an administrative district (raion), one of the forty in Nizhny Novgorod Oblast, Russia. Municipally, it is incorporated as Voznesensky Municipal District. It is located in the southwest of the oblast. The area of the district is 1,302.9 square kilometers (503.1 sq mi). Its administrative center is the urban locality (a work settlement) of Voznesenskoye. Population: 17,352 (2010 Census); 19,790 (2002 census); 22,538 (1989 Soviet census). The population of Voznesenskoye accounts for 39.1% of the district's total population.

== History ==
The district was established in 1929.
