= City of Ventura Historic Landmarks and Districts =

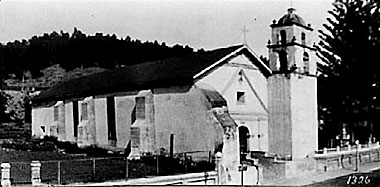
Mission San Buenaventura, c. 1900

The City of Ventura Historic Landmarks and Districts consist of buildings, sites, and neighborhoods designated by the City of Ventura, California, as historic landmarks and districts.

The first six sites designated as Ventura Historic Landmarks (VHL) were selected in February 1974. They are: the Olivas Adobe (VHL No. 1), the Ortega Adobe (VHL No. 2), the Father Serra statue (VHL No. 3), Ventura City Hall (VHL No. 4), the Grant Park cross site (VHL No. 5), and the Mission Plaza archeological site (VHL No. 6). In July 1974, the City also designated a second group of landmarks, including the Conklin residence (VHL No. 7), the Mission San Buenaventura (VHL No. 10), the Mission's Norfolk pine trees (VHL No. 8), and two large Moreton Bay fig trees located in city parks (VHL Nos. 11-12).

As of April 10, 2018, the City had designated 111 sites as Ventura Historic Landmarks and five areas as Ventura Historic Districts. The first historic district designated by the city was the Mission Historic District, extending from Poli Street at the northern border to Santa Clara Street at the southern border, and from Ventura Avenue on the west to Palm Street on the east. The Mission Historic District consists of the oldest section of the city's downtown area and includes more than ten historic landmarks, including the Mission, the Mission Plaza archeological site, the Mission's Norfolk pines, the Mission Plaza Moreton Bay fig tree, Peirano Store (VHL No. 32), the Carlo Hahn House (VHL No. 78), the Mission Lavanderia (VHL No. 85), and China Alley (VHL No. 91).

A map depicting the location of Ventura's designated historic landmarks and districts can be viewed by clicking "OpenStreetMap" or "Google Maps" in the template found to the right below.

== Landmarks ==
VHL No.	Name	Image	Address	Date listed	Description
1	Olivas Adobe		4200 Olivas Park Drive; 34.243796°N 119.243321°W	2/11/74	A one-story adobe structure was built in 1837 and expanded in 1849 by Don Raimundo Olivas; listed on the National Register of Historic Places in 1979 and designated as California Historical Landmark No. 115; operated as a museum
2	Ortega Adobe		215 W. Main St. 34.281683°N 119.304127°W	2/11/74	Adobe structure first built in 1857; the roof of the adobe used tiles from the Mission after the 1857 Fort Tejon earthquake; it became the first home of the Ortega chili company; open to public for self-guided tours
3	Father Serra statue		501 Poli St. 34.281874°N 119.293036°W	2/11/74	Concrete statue of Junípero Serra in front of Ventura City Hall commissioned by Ventura County through the Works Progress Administration as part of the Federal Art Project. The original statue, sculpted by Uno John Palo Kangas, was replaced in 1989 with a bronze cast. Bronze and wood replicas are not deemed historic. Location of original concrete is not disclosed.
4	Ventura City Hall		501 Poli St. 34.282352°N 119.293036°W	2/11/74	Neoclassical courthouse built in 1912, designed by Albert C. Martin Sr.; became Ventura City Hall in 1972; terra cotta exterior decorations, friars' heads, and copper-sheathed dome; listed on the National Register of Historic Places in 1971 (first site in City of Ventura to be so designated) and designated as California Historical Landmark No. 847 and Ventura County Historical Landmark No. 12
5	Grant Park cross site		Ferro Drive; 34.284602°N 119.296213°W	2/11/74	Site in Grant Park where a cross has been located for many year; some accounts indicate that the first cross was erected in 1782; the cross has been replaced several times, most recently in 1941
6	Mission Plaza archeological site		100 Block E. Main St. 34.281038°N 119.299018°W	2/11/74	A one-and-a-half acre archaeological site west of the Mission San Buenaventura; the Albinger Museum is part of the site
7	Conklin residence		608 E. Thompson Blvd. 34.278090°N 119.291340°W	5/6/74	Cape Cod style house originally built in 1877; part of the Mitchell Block Historic District
8	Mission Norfolk Pines		211 E. Main St. 34.281181°N 119.298076°W	7/1/74	Norfolk Island pine trees (Araucaria heterophylla (synonym A. excelsa)) located adjacent to the San Buenaventura Mission, planted in the 1880s, lit during the Christmas season; designated in 2000 as California's Millennium Landmark Trees
9	Mound Pepper Tree	Upload image	5430 Telegraph Rd.	7/1/74	Pepper tree formerly located on site of the Mound Guest House; had a trunk circumference of 23.5 feet, a height of 43 feet (13 m), and a branch spread of 100 feet (30 m); no longer exists
10	Mission San Buenaventura		211 E. Main St. 34.281233°N 119.298241°W	7/1/74	The ninth Spanish mission established in California, established in 1782 by Father Junípero Serra; also listed on the National Register of Historic Places in 1975 and designated as California Historical Landmark #310
11	Plaza Park Moreton Bay Fig Tree		Corner of Chestnut and Santa Clara Streets; 34.279379°N 119.291309°W	7/1/74	Ficus macrophylla planted in 1874, 68 feet high with 130 foot branch spread
12	Mission Plaza Moreton Bay Fig Tree		100 block E. Main St. 34.280500°N 119.298443°W	7/1/74	Ficus macrophylla circa 1874, part of the Mission district on the National Register of Historic Places
13	Baker residence		2107 Poli St. 34.279742°N 119.268283°W	9/23/75	Victorian house built in 1888
14	Judge Ewing residence		605 Poli St. 34.282337°N 119.291296°W	9/23/75	Queen Anne revival style house with wrap-around porch built in 1894; the interior includes a library with carved paneling and tile floors
15	Theodore Groene Building		592 E. Main St. 34.280603°N 119.291801°W	10/27/75	Built in 1920s for Ventura Guarantee and Loan, later became Bahn's Jewelry Store, now operated as Limon y Sal; has interior murals by Norman Kennedy; original white paint removed 1982
16	San Miguel Chapel Site		Thompson Blvd. and Palm St. 34.278057°N 119.298168°W	10/27/75	Archaeological site at the location of the first outpost and center of operations that was established while the Mission San Buenaventura was being constructed
17	First Baptist Church of Ventura		101 S. Laurel St. 34.279307°N 119.285688°W	12/1/75	Mayan Revival church built in 1931, now operated as the Ventura Center for Spiritual Living; listed on the National Register of Historic Places in 2009
18	Shisholop Village Site/Cabrillo's Landing	Upload image	Beachfront at south end of Figueroa Street	12/22/75	Site of Chumash village settled after 1000 A.D.; visited by Juan Rodríguez Cabrillo in 1542
19	Elizabeth Bard Memorial Hospital		121 N. Fir St. 34.282454°N 119.290501°W	3/8/76	Opened as a hospital in 1902, now an office building; design is Mission Revival; listed on the National Register of Historic Places in 1977
20	Ventura Pier		Harbor Blvd. east of California St. 34.273909°N 119.291600°W	3/29/76	Wooden wharf first built in 1872, partially destroyed and rebuilt on multiple occasions; it was the longest wooden pier in California until a storm sheered off 420 feet in 1995
21	Emmanuel Franz House		31 N. Oak St. 34.281344°N 119.294789°W	3/29/76	Italianate style house built in 1879; listed on the National Register of Historic Places in 1982
22	Magnolia tree	Upload image	739 E. Santa Clara St.	3/29/76	Removed in 2002
23	Great Pacific Iron Works		235 W. Santa Clara St. 34.279826°N 119.304048°W	10/4/76	Originally operated as Hobson Brothers meat packing business, now owned and operated by Patagonia, Inc.
24	Ventura Theatre		26 S. Chestnut St. 34.280425°N 119.291462°W	10/4/76	Movie palace built in 1928, now a live music venue; listed on the National Register of Historic Places in 1986
25	First Post Office Building		377 E. Main St. 34.281045°N 119.295062°W	10/4/76	Built in 1902, used as Post Office until 1919; Kaapicat Cafe now operates on the ground floor with offices on the second floor
26	Hitching post		88 N. Ann St. 34.281908°N 119.284053°W	10/4/76	Last hitching post in the city
27	Apostolic Church		902 E. Main St. 34.280653°N 119.286788°W	12/20/76	Originally operated as the Alice Bartlett Club
28	Southern Methodist Episcopal Church		896 E. Main St. 34.280554°N 119.287142°W	7/11/77	Built in 1890, later operated as Victorian Rose Bed & Breakfast
29	Post Office murals		675 E. Santa Clara St. 34.279935°N 119.290274°W	10/24/77	Painted 1936-1937 by Gordon Grant as part of the Works Progress Administration's Federal Art Project
30	Livery/county garage		34 N. Palm St. 34.281332°N 119.295932°W	11/21/77	Began use in 1875 as a livery stable; used as a studio for the carving of a wooden replica of the Father Serra statue; has also been used as a coffeehouse music venue, an arts center, and, later, as an improvisational comedy theater
31	Packard Garage		42 N. Chestnut St. 34.279935°N 119.290274°W	11/21/77	Built in 1925 as an automobile show room, now headquarters of The Trade Desk
32	Peirano Store		204 E. Main St. 34.280607°N 119.297602°W	1/16/78	Red brick structure built in 1877 with ornamental relief brickwork; the City's oldest surviving brick structure; operated as a general merchandise and, later, grocery store by the Peirano family for more than 100 years; archaeological remains of the Mission Lavanderia (VHL 85) discovered under the structure in 1991
33	Peirano residence		107 S. Figueroa St. 34.279344°N 119.297992°W	1/16/78	Occupied by the Peirano family from 1897 to 1976
34	Theodosia Burr Shepherd Gardens		SE corner of Poli and Chestnut; 34.281874°N 119.291329°W	7/17/78	Garden of a famous horticulturalist; only remaining plants are a star pine and birds of paradise
35	Feraud General Merchandise Store		2 W. Main St. 34.280893°N 119.300961°W	7/17/78	Bakery and grocery store opened in 1903, now operated as Paddy's Bar and Lounge; also listed on the National Register of Historic Places in 1986
36	First National Bank of Ventura (1904)		401 E. Main St. 34.281108°N 119.294517°W	8/13/78	Built in 1903 as first location for First National Bank of Ventura; the shop Latitudes now operates on the ground floor
37	First National Bank of Ventura (1926)		494 E. Main St. 34.280620°N 119.293212°W	10/16/78	Operated by various banks, later retail; ground floor underwent restoration work in 2017
38	Bank of Italy Building		394 E. Main St. 34.280540°N 119.294856°W	12/4/78	Built 1923-24 in Italian Renaissance revival style; Corinthian columns and elaborate terra cotta carvings on facade
39	Dr. T. E. Cunnane Residence		128 S. California St. 34.279099°N 119.292793°W	12/18/78	Queen Anne revival cottage style home
40	A. C. Martin Building		69 S. California St. 34.279914°N 119.293307°W	4/9/79	Spanish Renaissance style building designed by Albert C. Martin Sr., built in 1926, operated as the Bella Maggiore Inn for many years until closure due to COVID.
41	Robert Sudden residence		825 Front St. 34.277223°N 119.288050°W	4/9/79	Built in 1886, moved in 1916
42	Robert M. Sheridan Residence		1029 Poli St. 34.282435°N 119.284976°W	5/21/79	American Craftsman bungalow
43	Chaffee & McKeeby / Einstein & Bernheim	Upload image	Main St. & Palm St.	5/21/79	Commercial structure built in 1872, it housed two general merchandise stores and later the Great Eastern Department Store; at the southeast corner where Rabo Bank now operates; demolished in December 1979
44	Dudley House		197 N. Ashwood Ave. 34.277641°N 119.240261°W	1/21/80	1892 Victorian farmhouse now operated by San Buenaventura Heritage, Inc., as an event venue; listed on the National Register of Historic Places in 1977
45	Righetti House		125 W. Park Row Ave. 34.285106°N 119.301688°W	1/21/80	Queen Anne revival house with Classical Revival elements
46	Selwyn Shaw House		140 N. Ann St. 34.282646°N 119.283648°W	1/21/80	Queen Anne revival house built in 1888; part of the Selwyn Shaw Historic District
47	Jacques Roos House		82 S. Ash St. 34.279820°N 119.288209°W	3/17/80	Queen Anne revival cottage style home with Eastlake influences, built in 1892
48	Dacy Fazio House		557 E. Thompson Blvd. 34.278517°N 119.292196°W	4/14/80	American Craftsman bungalow built in 1910
49	Terry House		4949 Foothill Rd. 34.283998°N 119.229422°W	7/14/80	Farm house built in 1917, once operated as a Unitarian church
50	Bert Shaw House		1141 Poli St. 34.282329°N 119.283307°W	9/15/80	Victorian house built in 1896 with a modified Palladian window on the front
51	Blackstock House		835 E. Main St. 34.281099°N 119.287969°W	9/15/80	Built in 1901 on the site of city hall, moved in 1911 to its present site
52	Sifford House		162 S. Ash St. 34.278788°N 119.288209°W	9/15/80	Built in 1895, includes a portico columned front door, framed by a horseshoe shaped arch
53	Nellie Clover House		857 E. Main St. 34.281073°N 119.287664°W	11/80	Turn of the century cottage with Italianate cornice and Corinthian columns; later an office for Ventura County Jewish Family Service
54	Kimball House		7891 E. Telephone Rd. 34.269200°N 119.187756°W	7/81	Built in 1928, house has Colonial and Mission elements
55	Dunning House		932 E. Main St. 34.280559°N 119.286439°W	9/81	California bungalow built approximately 1920
56	Granger House		1206 E. Main St. 34.280669°N 119.282218°W	1/82	Victorian house with high-pitched hipped roof topped with iron cresting and intersecting gables
57	Morrison House		331 Poli St. 34.282351°N 119.295833°W	5/18/82	Victorian house with Eastlake details; the house was originally located at 1785 N. Ventura Avenue and was moved in 1985
58	San Buenaventura Mission Aqueduct		East end of Vince and Lewis Streets	8/2/82	Seven-mile long aqueduct built starting in 1792 to supply water to the Mission San Buenaventura and local farms; the aqueduct began at the convergence point of San Antonio Creek and the Ventura River. The section of the aqueduct in the photograph is located at 234 Cañada Larga Road (south side), 1/4 block east of Highway 33, and has been listed on the National Register of Historic Places and designated as Ventura County Historical Landmark No. 28 and California Historic Landmark No. 114.
59	Blackburn House		721 E. Main St. 34.281066°N 119.289633°W	1/9/84	Queen Anne revival house with Colonial Revival elements built in 1896; now offices for McCarthy Companies
60	Alessandro Lagoon	Upload image	Vista Del Mar Dr. & Alessandro Dr. 34.272902°N 119.280795°W	12/82	Known in the late 19th and early 20th centuries as Chautaqua Flats, the area was camping and amusement enterprises; later a freshwater refuge on the Pacific Flyway; the seven-acre site extends east from the junction of Vista Del Mar and Alessandro Drives for about three-tenths of a mile along Alessandro Drive to the west of the northern border fence for Highway 101.
61	Elwell House		143 S. Figueroa St. 34.278938°N 119.297966°W	3/7/85	Built in 1892, now used as offices
62	Suyter House		1157 Poli St. 34.282340°N 119.283106°W	4/22/85	Queen Anne revival style house built by Selwyn Shaw, 1890-91; part of the Selwyn Shaw Historic District
63	El Jardin Patio Bldg.		451-461 E. Main St. 34.281008°N 119.293848°W		Two-story shopping court built in the 1920s; an archway on Main Street leads into the landscaped courtyard
64	Robert Brakey Residence		413 Poli St. 34.282347°N 119.294544°W	10/14/85	Victorian house built in 1890, later operated as the La Mer bed and breakfast
65	Judge Ben T. Williams House		386 Franklin Lane; 34.301419°N 119.288889°W	1/26/87	Queen Anne revival ranch house with Stick Eastlake influence built c. 1890; originally located on Ventura Avenue, but moved c. 1950 to Franklin Lane
66	Charles Corcoran House		831 Buena Vista St. 34.282989°N 119.288072°W	4/1/86	Spanish Colonial Revival house built in 1930
67	Charles Cooper House		163 Cedar St. 34.282795°N 119.299146°W	10/14/86	Built in 1886 by a local carpenter
68	Josiah Keene House		41 Bell Way; 34.291369°N 119.298477°W	9/28/87	Second Empire/Victorian house with steep mansard roof built in 1872; also designated in 1970 as Ventura County Historical Landmark No. 33.
69	Hartman House		73 N. Palm St. 34.281721°N 119.296423°W	9/28/87	American Craftsman bungalow built c. 1911
70	J. A. Day House		759 E. Poli St. 34.282333°N 119.289100°W	4/25/88	Victorian house built in 1889 in the Stick-Eastlake style
71	Ventura County Mutual Fire Insurance Co. Bldg.		692 E. Main St. 34.280628°N 119.290234°W	4/25/88	Art Deco or Moderne style concrete office building with Aztec Revival flower elements designed by architect William W. Ache; later operated as a Mexican restaurant and then as the Fluid State bar
72	Erburu House		2465 Hall Canyon Rd. 34.280245°N 119.261792°W	1/5/89	American Craftsman bungalow built in 1909
73	McCoskey Love House		119 S. Figueroa St. 34.279153°N 119.298078°W	7/17/89	Victorian house with Italianate influence; originally located at corner of Chestnut and Santa Clara; now used as offices
74	Kate Duval House		953 E. Main St. 34.281037°N 119.286237°W	7/17/89	Queen Anne revival cottage built in 1902
75	J. Hoover Love House		970 E. Santa Clara St. 34.279301°N 119.285939°W	7/17/89	House with Mediterranean Revival exterior and Arts and Crafts interior, built in 1923
76	Mabel Nellie Owen House		93 W. Simpson St. 34.288996°N 119.300083°W	1/22/90	Home of a local activist, designated as a landmark; located in the Simpson Tract. Owen and her husband bought the house at the end of World War II and lived there for many years.
77	Dr. Cephus Bard House		52 W. Mission Ave. 34.285335°N 119.300508°W	4/1/91	House built in 1886 for Ventura's first American doctor, who founded the Elizabeth Bard Hospital as a tribute to his mother
78	Carlo Hahn House		211 E. Santa Clara St. 34.279780°N 119.297399°W	7/15/91	Victorian house built in 1905, then rebuilt and expanded in 1971; operated by a series of restaurants and bars ("Santa Clara House", "The Big Green House", "Andy's Barbecue Heaven," and most recently "The Tavern")
79	Hammonds/Reese House	Upload image	637-639 Poli St. 34.282353°N 119.290861°W	9/14/92	Queen Anne revival house with Colonial Revival elements and a wraparound porch, built in 1905
80	Pierpont Inn		550 Sanjon Rd. 34.273432°N 119.283395°W	2/1/93	American Craftsman bungalow-style inn built in 1910 for motoring tourists
81	Arthur D. Briggs House		856 E. Thompson Blvd. 34.278018°N 119.287664°W	5/10/93	Queen Anne style house built in 1894
82	Tudor House		301 S. Dunning St. 34.268701°N 119.251124°W	10/13/93	English Tudor revival house built in 1929 on hill overlooking the ocean
83	Arcade Building		38-50 W. Main St. 34.280848°N 119.301479°W	3/21/94	Built in the 1920s, it has been operated as Dodge, Chrysler, Edsel, Jaguar, and vintage car dealerships
84	Cassidy Dairy Ranch		3908 Loma Vista Rd. 34.277271°N 119.242907°W	5/16/94	Colonial Revival house built by Selwyn Shaw in 1894
85	San Buenaventura Mission Lavanderia		204-208 E. Main St. (underneath); 34.280615°N 119.297476°W	11/14/94	Archaeological remains of the Mission's lavanderia discovered in 1991 under storage rooms of the Peirano Market and Wilson Studio buildings
86	Erle Stanley Gardner Office		21 S. California St. 34.280369°N 119.293245°W	2/6/95	Law office of Erle Stanley Gardner, author of the Perry Mason books, was located at the northeast corner on the third floor
87	Casa de Anza		606-612 N. Ventura Ave., 11-15 E. Simpson St. 34.288645°N 119.298242°W	3/23/98	Spanish Colonial Revival apartment building built in 1929 to house oil workers with retail on first floor; a city library branch now operates on the ground floor
88	WWII artillery emplacements		Near Ventura River Mouth; 34.276369°N 119.309720°W	9/98	Camp Seaside artillery site built in 1942 in response to the Bombardment of Ellwood, a Japanese submarine attack on the Ellwood Oil Field; located on the west side of the Ventura River estuary within the borders of Emma Wood State Beach
89	Norton Ranch House		71 N. Palm St. 34.281549°N 119.296409°W	10/98	American Craftsman style house built in 1910 on a walnut farm in east Ventura; moved to its present location in 1990 where it became a French restaurant (since closed). Now home to Ten Tigers bar and Caje Coffee.
90	John C. Fremont Camp	Upload image	100 Block E. Main Street	1/11/99	On January 5, 1847, during the Mexican–American War, John C. Frémont and elements of his California Battalion encamped in an orchard west of the Mission orchard's wall; there was a skirmish with locals in which a merchant, Don Jose Arnaz, was captured and forced to provide supplies.
91	China Alley Historic Area		200 Block E. Main Street; 34.280414°N 119.297633°W	Perpendicular to Figueroa Street between Main and Santa Clara Streets	Center of Chinese settlement and commercial activity starting in the early 1880s
92	Louis Rudolph Craftsman Bungalow		958 E. Santa Clara St. 34.279333°N 119.286121°W	3/02	American Craftsman bungalow built in 1922
93	Petit Tudor		1725 Miramar Dr. 34.283614°N 119.272708°W	10/02	English Tudor house built in 1929, designed by John C. Austin
94	Rancho Attilio Site		10814 Telephone Rd. 34.281862°N 119.153809°W	3/27/06	117-acre ranch established in 1916 by Attilio Vanoni; associated with the development of the Saticoy area; the small parcel on Telephone Road is the site of the original Vanoni homestead
95	Mayfair Theater Site		793 East Santa Clara St. 34.279672°N 119.288907°W	3/27/06	Site of Moderne movie palace designed by S. Charles Lee, it later became an adult theater; damaged by fire in 2000 and demolished in 2004
96	Coast Live Oak Tree		Thompson Blvd. and Palm St. 34.278802°N 119.296362°W	3/27/06	Located at the southwest corner of the San Miguel Chapel site, a Coast Live Oak tree with a diameter of 52 inches
97	Matthew H. Arnold Residence		92 North Fir St. 34.281930°N 119.289774°W	3/27/06	Colonial Revival house built in 1907
98	Lewis Rudolph Residence		86 Encinal Place; 34.280712°N 119.275364°W	10/15/07	Spanish Revival house built in 1927; the family of Olympic gold medalist Mike Larrabee lived in the house
99	Elks Ventura Lodge No. 1430		11 S. Ash St. 34.280473°N 119.288821°W	5/5/08	Spanish Colonial Revival structure built in 1928; occupied by the Benevolent and Protective Order of Elks from 1928 to 2004.Now home to Hotel San Buena.
100	Ventura Avenue Water Purification Plant		5895 N. Ventura Ave. 34.342960°N 119.293995°W	2/5/08	Spanish Colonial Revival administration building constructed in 1938; designated as well for representing the city's water development history
101	Harry S. Valentine House		993 E. Santa Clara St. 34.279769°N 119.285667°W	3/10/08	Craftsman house with Oriental influences, built in 1915
102	McGuire Building/Pythian Castle		315-321 E. Main St. 34.281005°N 119.295844°W		Built 1906-1907, commercial structure includes decorative brick facade with a recessed X and O pattern and friezes
103	Strickland Residence		1660 Poli St. 34.281061°N 119.275092°W	9/21/09	Designated for association with notable women, including Florence Brigham and her daughter Helen Brigham
104	Hobart-Barr-Lucking Residence		230 S. Ash St. 34.277864°N 119.288254°W	7/19/10	Colonial Revival house built between 1902 and 1906
105	Thomas Gavin Gabbert Farmhouse		280 Parsons Ave. 34.280417°N 119.233418°W	9/27/10	Craftsman style farmhouse built between 1910 and 1914
106	Lucking Residence		244 S. Ash St. 34.277706°N 119.288256°W	8/6/12	Colonial Revival house with a rock foundation and decorative wood posts, pilasters, carved dentils; built by Franklin and Julia Cook Hobart between 1892 and 1905
107	Albert G. and Maude Shaffer Residence		134 Chrisman Ave. 34.278101°N 119.277769°W	10/21/13	Spanish Colonial Revival house built in 1927
108	Swift and Company Building		305 S. Kalorama St. 34.276825°N 119.287142°W	5/5/14	Spanish Colonial with Mission Revival influences
109	Frederick Neill & Ida Foster Baker Residence		1093 Poli St. 34.282383°N 119.284123°W	5/8/17	Craftsman style house
110	The Mission Hotel building		79-97 S. Oak St. 34.279739°N 119.294989°W	5/8/17	Built in 1926 in Spanish Colonial Revival style; Jaguar Moon restaurant currently operates on the ground level
111	The Hamilton Hotel (1924)		363-367 E. Main St. 34.281025°N 119.295225°W	5/8/17	Commercial block built in 1924 with decorative brick facade with hotel name and letter "H" etched into recesses

== Districts ==
Name	Image	Boundaries	Description
Mission Historic District		Santa Clara St. (south), Ventura Ave. (west), Poli St. (north), Palm Street (east)	The oldest section of downtown Ventura surrounding Mission San Buenaventura; the district includes more than ten historic landmarks.
Mitchell Block Historic District		Plaza Park/Houses at 608, 620, 632, 644, 658, 670, 682 and 692 Thompson Boulevard; 34.278078°N 119.290715°W	The district includes Plaza Park and the historic homes across Thompson Street from the park, including the Conklin Residence and the Mary Mitchell House; "the only intact and relatively unaltered block of houses remaining downtown"
Selwyn Shaw Historic District		Buena Vista St. (north), Ann St. (west), Hemlock St. (east), Poli St. (south); 34.282347°N 119.283097°W	City block northwest of downtown includes three historic landmarks: Selwyn Shaw House; Suyter House; and Bert Shaw House.
Simpson Tract Historic District	Upload image	Sheridan Way (west), Ventura Avenue (east), W. Prospect St. (south), W. Simpson St. (north); 34.288139°N 119.300796°W	Four city blocks and 182 homes located west of Ventura Avenue, built from 1925 to 1930 provided affordable housing to workers during the city's oil boom; designated a historic district in 1990
Ivy Lawn Cemetery Historic District		5400 Valentine Rd. 34.254546°N 119.215699°W	Cemetery deemed a historic district in 2013 for its architecture and as the burial place of historically-important people

== Other designations ==
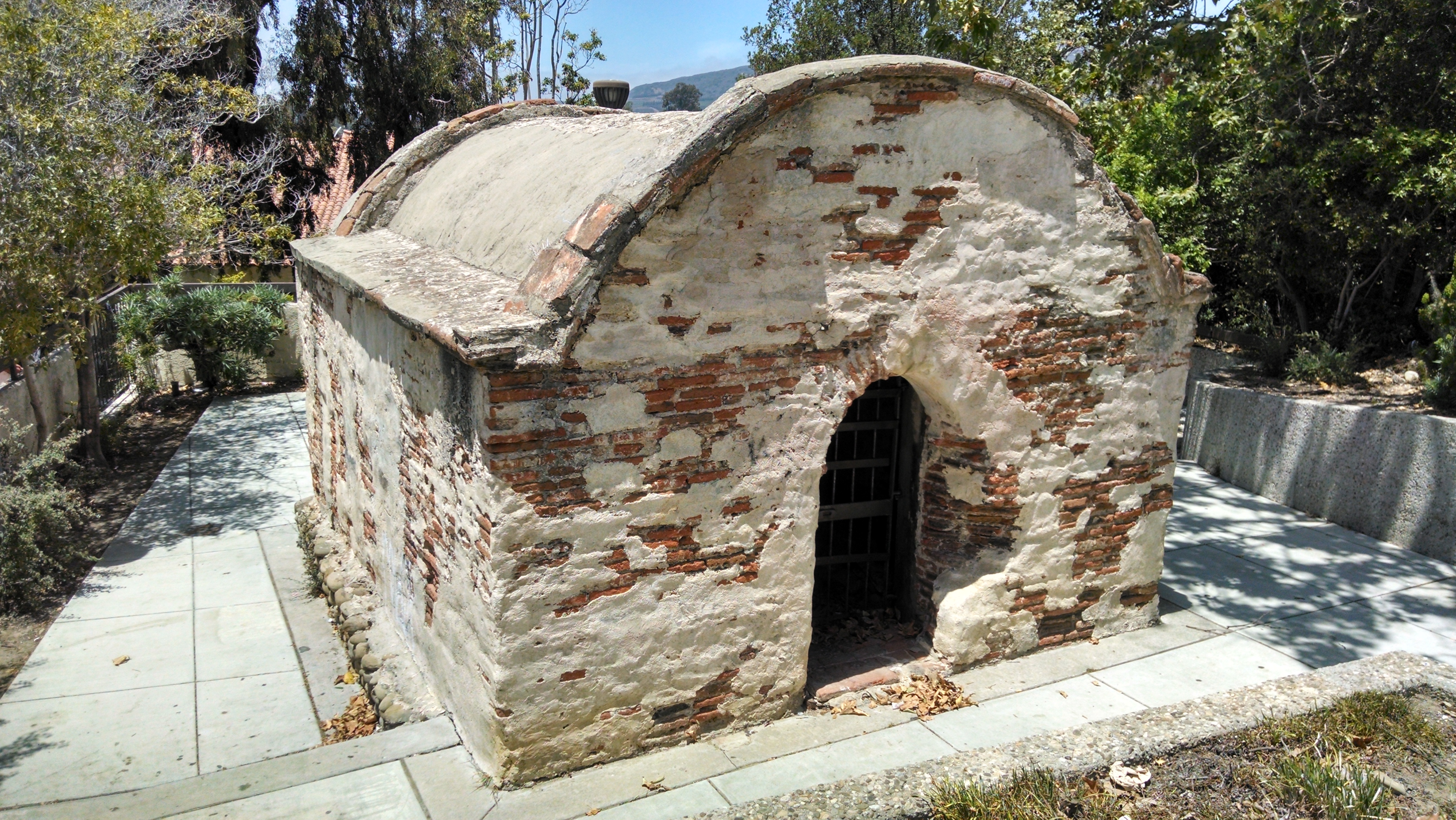
Old Mission Reservoir

Other Ventura sites receiving historic designations:

- Thomas Gould Jr. House. American Craftsman style California bungalow at 402 Lynn Drive, built in 1924 and designed by Henry Greene of Greene and Greene. The house was listed on the National Register of Historic Places in 2005.
- Old Mission Reservoir. Part of the water system for Mission San Buenaventura (the settling tank or receiving reservoir; the site can be found in Eastwood Park); designated as California Historical Landmark No. 114.
- Santa Gertrudis Asistencia (Chapel) Monument. The structure was built in 1809 and ceased operation around 1840. The site was in the path of the Ojai freeway, and the remains were moved in 1968 with several foundation stones being used to create the monument. Located 0.3 miles north of the Avenue Water Treatment Facility (VHL 100) on the east side of the road, flanked by two cypress trees. Designated as Ventura County Historical Landmark No. 11 in December 1970.
- Five Trees. Five blue gum eucalyptus trees on the hilltop overlooking Ventura were designated in 1987 as Ventura County Historical Landmark No. 110. Joseph Sexton planted a row of 13 trees in 1898, but a 1903 fire destroyed all but five of the trees. Three of the remaining trees were cut down by vandals in 1940 but were replaced. In 1956, four of the trees were cut down, leaving only one. Replacement trees were planted in 1966 but only two remained for many years, known locally as "Two Trees".Both are currently in very ill health, and a new one has been planted since.

== See also ==
- National Register of Historic Places listings in Ventura County, California
- California Historical Landmarks in Ventura County, California
- Ventura County Historic Landmarks & Points of Interest
