= Ortega Adobe =

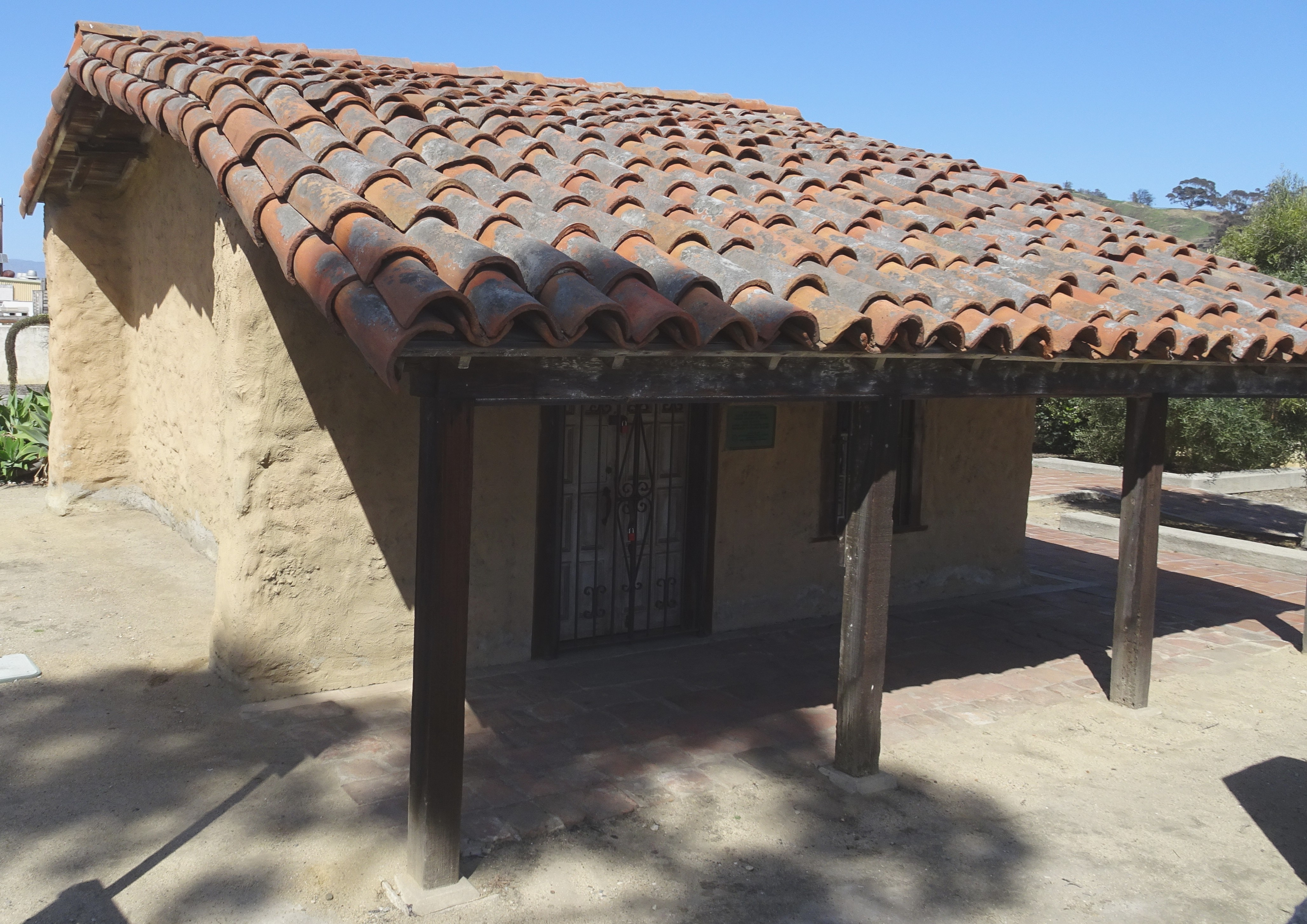
- Ortega Adobe, April 2018

- Location within southern California
- 34°16′54″N 119°18′15″W
- Location: 215 West Main Street, Ventura, California

History
- Built: c. 1857

Ortega Adobe is a historic adobe house built in 1857 and located on Main Street on the west side of Ventura, California, not far from the mouth of the Ventura River. It was designated in 1974 as the City of Ventura's Historic Landmark No. 2. It is owned by the City and operated as a self-guided historical site.

Ortega Adobe is the City's "only remaining example of a 'middle class' home of the late 1800s." At one time, much of Ventura's Main Street was lined with adobe homes. The Ortega Adobe is the only one to survive.

== Construction ==
The Ortega Adobe sits on land formerly owned by the Mission San Buenaventura. Several sources indicate that Emigdio Miguel Ortega (1813-1893) purchased the 200- by 200-foot lot which became the site of the adobe in 1857. However, real property records maintained at the Museum of Ventura County indicate that the land was purchased by Francisco Ortega from Lino Maria in May 1848 and then transferred by Francisco to Emigdio in January 1849.

In 1857, Emigdio Ortega, the grandson of José Francisco Ortega, built the adobe. The biggest obstacle was the lack of lumber in the Ventura area. Ortega acquired the beams and rafters for his adobe from an abandoned adobe, possibly the Carrillo Sespe Adobe, near what is now the City of Fillmore. According to Emigdio's son, Emilio C. Ortega, the older adobe was abandoned after "a band of Mojave Indians swooped upon the ranch, murdered the people and drove away the stock." Emigdio hauled the lumber 40 miles using oxcarts in a four-day journey from the abandoned adobe.

The main roof beam at the Ortega Adobe had reportedly been used for the same purpose at the older adobe for approximately 70 years. According to archeologist Robert Browne, who worked on the adobe's restoration in 1970, the beams were exposed and analyzed during the renovation. Of the massive ridge pole, Browne said: "That beam was hewn from Jeffrey pine in Sespe Canyon and was once a part of a much earlier adobe where Fillmore now stands. It may have been built about the time of Father Serra's mission."

Ortega purchased roof tiles and bricks from the Mission fathers at the nearby Mission San Buenaventura. In January 1857, the Mission was damaged in the Fort Tejon earthquake; the roof tiles were shaken loose, and the fathers opted to replace the tiles with cedar shingles.

== Historic uses ==
=== Ortega family home ===
The adobe was used as the Ortega family's home for more than 40 years. The family moved there from another adobe at the corner of Main Street and Ventura Avenue, a location that was later the site of the Feraud General Merchandise Store. Emigdio and his wife, Maria Conception Jacinta Dominguez Ortega, had 13 children.

In 1866, the Ventura River flooded and swept away one of the rooms on the west end of the adobe. Warned of the coming flood, the Ortegas moved their possessions, including a pet dog and lamb, to a nearby frame house. Their son, Emilio, later wrote that the frame house was swept out to sea with the family's possessions and pets, but the adobe fared better: "The flood also took one-half the adobe building and left what now stands. You can never imagine the desolation of the surroundings. I can well remember how we ran along on the beach, scanning every nook in hopes of finding our pets, or some of the trunks . . . filled with clothes . . . All was lost."

=== Ortega chile business ===
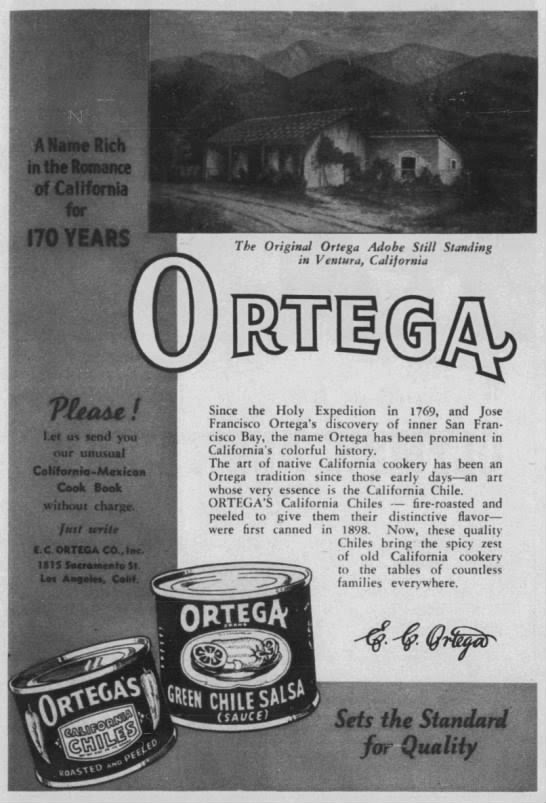
Ortega advertisement from 1939 featuring an image of the old adobe

In the late 1890s, the family began roasting in the adobe's kitchen and built a wood shed adjacent to the adobe where the family's products were canned. The Ortegas' 11th child, Emilio, established the Ortega Chile Packing Company at the site. By 1899, Emilio's company had opened a factory three miles from Ventura where it employed 16 women and four men and processed 22 tons of chiles into 55,000 cans of roasted green chiles and green chile salsa bearing the image of the old adobe. Even in the 1930s, the company's advertising continued to appeal to the romance of old California, featuring an image of "The Original Ortega Adobe Still Standing in Ventura, California".

=== Subsequent uses ===
The Ortega family's food business moved to larger quarters in Los Angeles in the early 1900s, and the Ortega Adobe was sold in approximately 1903 or 1905 to Ung Hing, a Chinese immigrant. In 1913, Ung Hing sold the property to Edgar Carne. Carne rented the property to Lee Leon who turned it into a Mexican restaurant.

The City of Ventura acquired the property from Carne in 1921. From the 1920s through the 1960s, the building was leased for various purposes. It was leased to Shell Oil Company for use as offices from 1924 to 1931 and to the Veterans of Foreign Wars for use as a veterans hall from the late 1930s to the early 1950s. It was used by the Ventura Police Department as a police station from late 1952 until February 1954. From 1954 to 1967, it was leased to the Ventura' Boys' Club as a meeting hall. It has also reportedly been used as a saloon, a speakeasy, and the home of a potter.

== Restoration and historic designation ==
By the late 1960s, the adobe, owned by the city, was vacant and beginning to decay. The city council voted in September 1969 to restore the adobe as a historical museum and tourist attraction. In addition to renovating the building, volunteers led by Werner Weile and archeologist Robert O. Brown acquired and donated household artifacts and furniture representative of the period. After two years of restoration, the adobe was opened to the public in April 1971. Browne said at the time: "We are trying to bring it back to its original state. This, of course, entails preserving some features and reconstructing others."

According to a 1985 account by Richard Senate, a city official, the renovation ignored recommendations from the archeologist and covered the thick adobe walls with a coating of cement. The cement coating led to the adobe's deterioration as the adobe was unable to expand and contract with temperature changes.

The building was designated as the City of Ventura's Historic Landmark No. 2 in 1974. The adobe is open for self-guided public viewing featuring interpretive panels on the history of the building and the Ortega family. The three rooms on display are a kitchen, a bedroom, and a living room. The front room is original 1857 construction; the two rooms at the back of the adobe are additions dating from the years between 1867 and 1890.

== See also ==
- City of Ventura Historic Landmarks and Districts
- B&G Foods - owner of the Ortega brand of chiles and sauces
