= Peirano =

Peirano is an Italian surname. Notable people with the surname include:

- Alejandro Peirano (born 1993), Chilean middle-distance runner
- Miguel Gustavo Peirano (born 1966), Argentine economist and former government minister
- Miguel Peirano (footballer) (born 1960), former Uruguayan footballer
- Pablo Peirano (born 1975), Uruguayan football manager and player
- Pedro Peirano (born 1972), Chilean director, screenwriter, journalist, cartoonist and television producer
- Irene Peirano Garrison, American philologist and Pope Professor of the Latin Language and Literature

== See also ==
- Peirano Market, historic building in Ventura, California, United States of America
- Peyrano
