= Mitchell Block Historic District =

The Mitchell Block Historic District is a historic district in Ventura, California. The district was designated as a historic district by the City of Ventura on May 31, 1980. It was also declared eligible as a National Historic District in 1982. It has been described as "the only intact and relatively unaltered block of houses remaining downtown". The district consists of Plaza Park, the Plaza Park Moreton Bay fig tree, and eight houses in the 600 block of East Thompson Boulevard. Two of the features have been designated independently as Ventura Historic Landmarks: the Plaza Park Moreton Bay fig tree and the Conklin residence at 680 East Thompson Boulevard.

In the 1880s, Irish immigrants John, Thomas, and Edward Mitchell purchased the lots on the south side of East Thompson Boulevard and built two houses. The Mitchells sold off the remaining lots in 1904 and 1905, at which time the remaining houses were built.

Several of the properties had fallen into disrepair in the 1970s, and the district's historic designation was credited with spurring property owners to renovate and preserve the block.

In 2007, the City's Historic Resources Group recommended limiting the historic district to the eight houses on the south side of East Thompson Boulevard and separately designating Plaza Park as a historic landmark.

== Inventory of contributing properties ==
The properties and features included in the district are as follows:

| Name | Image | Address | Year built | Description |
| Plaza Park | | Santa Clara St. (north), Fir St. (east), Thompson Blvd. (south), Chestnut St. (west) | 1869 | Ventura's first city park established in 1869 covering a city block in downtown Ventura, and used for various festivals and events |
| Conklin residence | | 608 E. Thompson Blvd. | 1877 | American Colonial style house; the oldest house on the block; designated as Ventura Historic Landmark No. 7 in 1974. |
| William McGuire house | | 620 E. Thompson Blvd. | 1905 | Victorian era style house |
| Earl E. Barnes house | | 632 E. Thompson Blvd. | 1904 | Craftsman house with deep porch |
| Joseph M. Riley house | | 644 E. Thompson Blvd. | 1904 | Queen Anne style house |
| Dr. J. J. Streets house | | 658 E. Thompson Blvd. | 1903 | Queen Anne style house |
| Mary Mitchell house | | 670 E. Thompson Blvd. | 1890 | Victorian era brick house with Gothic elements and a square castle-like tower, built by the Mitchell brothers in 1890 for Edward Mitchell's daughter, Mary |
| W.F. Sittel house | | 682 E. Thompson Blvd. | 1905 | Victorian era style house |
| John Mitchell house | | 692 E. Thompson Blvd. | 1886 | Italianate style brick house designed by architect T. B. Steepleton with gabled roofs and tall windows; built by the Mitchell brothers in 1886 for Edward Mitchell's son, John; one of two remaining brick houses in the city built before 1900 |
| Plaza Park Moreton Bay Fig Tree | | NW corner of Plaza Park | 1874 | Ficus macrophylla planted in 1874, 68 feet high with 130 foot branch spread |

== See also ==
- City of Ventura Historic Landmarks and Districts
