= Ventura County Courthouse =

Historic building in Ventura, California used as City Hall

- U.S. National Register of Historic Places
- California Historical Landmark
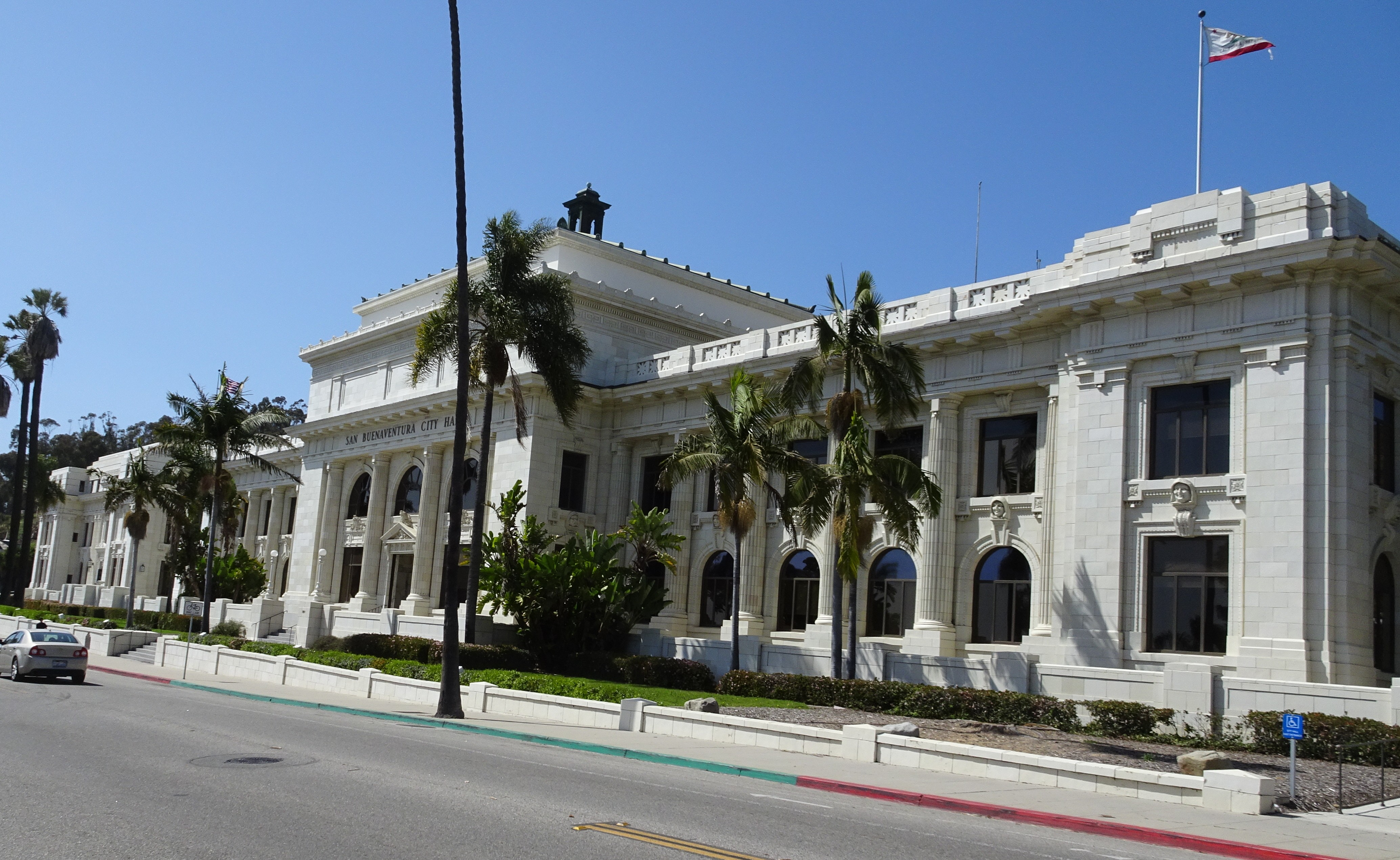
- Ventura City Hall, April 2018

- Location within California Location within the United States
- Location: 501 Poli St., Ventura, California
- Coordinates: 34°16′57″N 119°17′32″W
- Built: 1912
- Architect: Albert C. Martin, Sr.
- Architectural style: Neoclassical, Beaux Arts
- NRHP reference No.: 71000211
- CHISL No.: 847

Significant dates
- Added to NRHP: August 19, 1971
- Designated CHISL: 1971

The Ventura County Courthouse, known since 1974 as Ventura City Hall, is a historic building in Ventura, California. Located on a hill at the top of California Street, it overlooks the city's downtown district with views of the Santa Barbara Channel and Channel Islands. It was the first building in the City of Ventura to be listed on the National Register of Historic Places and has also received historic designations at the state, county and city levels.

Built from 1912 to 1913, the Neoclassical courthouse was designed by the Los Angeles architect Albert C. Martin Sr. in a Beaux Arts style. The building's facade includes white glazed terra cotta panels and decorations, including 24 whimsical faces of Franciscan friars, fluted Doric columns, a copper-sheathed dome and cupola, as well as Roman-arched windows. The second-floor city council chambers (previously the building's courtroom) include carved mahogany woodwork, stained glass skylights and arched windows overlooking the city and ocean.

The courthouse was expanded in the early 1930s with the construction of an annex off the building's west wing. In 1968, the building was declared structurally unsound and county workers relocated to a new complex. The City of Ventura purchased the building from the county and renovated it at a cost of approximately $3.4 million. The building has served as Ventura City Hall since 1974.

== The building and historic designations ==
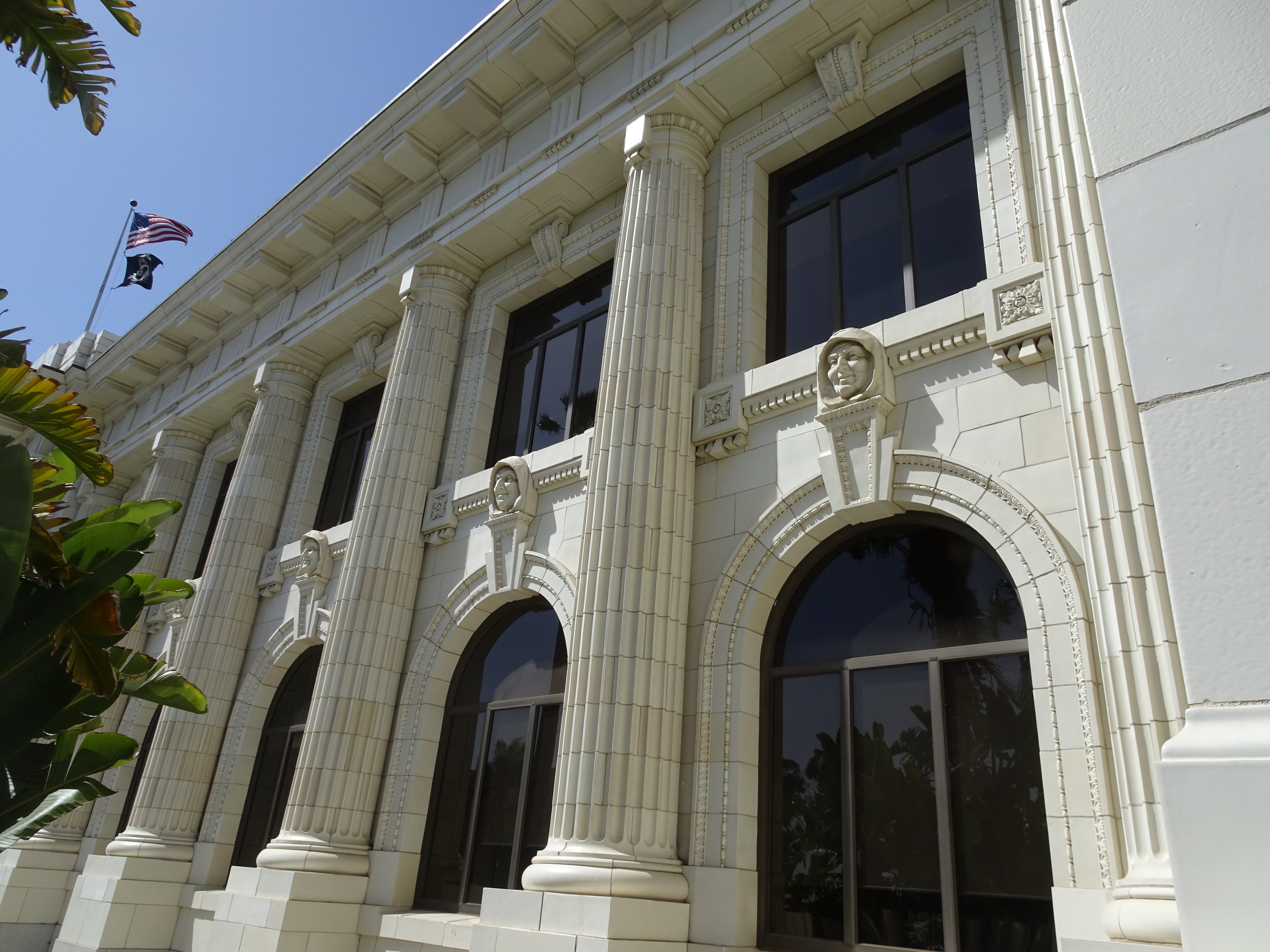
Terra cotta facade with friars' heads

The building architecture has been described as Neoclassical Revival, Beaux Arts Classicisim, Roman Doric, and French Renaissance. The architect Albert C. Martin referred to it as "resembling Roman Doric". When the plans were unveiled in 1911, the Los Angeles Times reported that the "Roman Doric order" design would be "one of the most imposing public structures in California, and a credit to the seat of government of the prosperous lima bean section."

Notable design features of the facade include white glazed terra cotta panels and decorations, including 24 whimsical faces of Franciscan friars, fluted Doric columns, a copper-sheathed dome and cupola, Roman-arched windows, and ornate brass gates and double doors. The interior design features include extensive use of Italian marble, bronze balustrades, and a large, second-floor courtroom (now city council chambers) with carved mahogany woodwork, three domes with leaded, stained glass skylights, and arched windows overlooking the city and ocean.

The building has been praised as one of Southern California's most beautiful government buildings. In 1926, the Ventura Star wrote: "She stands majestically upon the hill, this courthouse of ours, with her national colors fluttering in the harbor breezes, for all the world like a beautiful woman in a Paris gown." In 1991, the Los Angeles Times said of the landmark structure: "Probably no local structure is more visually and symbolically dramatic, or as steeped in local legend. Perched like a lordly, lavish manor at the juncture of California and Poli streets, it overlooks the old town and the blue Pacific beyond – a constant reminder of the past."

The courthouse has been designated as a historic building at the federal, state, county, and city levels. In December 1970, it was designated as Ventura County Historic Landmark No. 12. Five months later, in May 1971, it was designated as California Historical Landmark No. 847. Three months after that, in August 1971, the building was listed on the National Register of Historic Places, the first building in the city (and the second in the county) to be so recognized. When the City of Ventura adopted its own historic landmark program in February 1974, the courthouse was one of the first buildings to be selected, receiving the designation as Ventura Historic Landmark No. 4.

== Construction and early history ==
=== 1873 courthouse ===
The original Ventura County Courthouse was built at a cost of $10,000 in 1873 by William Dewey Hobson, who had earlier in the year successfully lobbied the California Legislature to create Ventura County. The land, donated by Bishop Thaddeus Amat, was carved out of the gardens at the Mission San Buenaventura at a location between Santa Clara, Meta (now Thompson), Figueroa, and Junipero Streets. After the new courthouse opened in 1913, the old courthouse remained vacant, though it was used for a time as housing for indigent Mexican families. The old courthouse was ultimately demolished in 1921 by contractor A. Pefley who purchased the building from the county for $200 and salvaged 200,000 bricks from the structure. A 2007 archaeological dig uncovered a portion of the mission era wall foundation built with 40 to 50 pound stones as expected from historical surveys and maps. The dig found artifacts from many periods besides the first courthouse, jail, and first hospital including signs of the long history of human settlement such as beads made of shells by Native Americans harvested from the nearby ocean.

=== Design and construction (1910–1913) ===
By 1910, the tower of the original courthouse was badly cracked and leaning over the front entrance. A bigger courthouse would also better serve the county's population which had grown from 5,073 in 1880 to 18,347 in 1910. Judge Felix Ewing recommended the site at the top of California Street for a new courthouse. The Board of Supervisors followed Judge Ewing's recommendation, deciding to acquire land totaling 400 feet by 400 feet along the north side of Poli Street, a site occupied by the homes of James Blackstock and Henry Neel. However, a bond measure to raise funds for the new courthouse was defeated in 1911. The following year, voters approved a $150,000 bond measure to build the courthouse.

The noted Los Angeles architect Albert C. Martin was commissioned to design the new courthouse. Martin's Los Angeles works include Los Angeles City Hall, the May Company Building, and St. Vincent de Paul Church. His Ventura County works include St. Mary Magdalen Church in Camarillo and the Bella Maggiore Inn in downtown Ventura.

The courthouse was built in 1912 and 1913 at a cost of $278,000.

The July 1913 dedication of the courthouse was celebrated in two days of events with a crowd estimated at 20,000 attending the festivities. The festivities began on the first day with a lengthy parade featuring seven bands, four companies of seamen and marines from the USS South Dakota anchored at Ventura, decorated automobiles, and floats from every chamber of commerce and lodge in the county, including one built in the shape of a giant lima bean pod (then the county's biggest cash crop) and another bearing a local girl dressed as the "Goddess of Liberty". After the parade, speeches were given at Plaza Park, and horse races and fireworks followed at Seaside Park. On the second day, Adolfo Camarillo, chairman of the County Board of Supervisors, formally turned over the building, and a ball was held that evening under electric lights at the new courthouse.

=== Operation as courthouse (1913–1968) ===
Front of Ventura City Hall

From 1913 to 1968, the building functioned as the Ventura County Courthouse. It also housed other offices of the county government and was the site of meetings of the County Board of Supervisors.

One of the noted defense attorneys to practice at the courthouse in the 1920s and 1930s was Erle Stanley Gardner. Gardner maintained an office one block south of the courthouse from which he practiced law and also wrote the Perry Mason novels. Gardner published the first of 82 Perry Mason novels in 1933.

==== Courthouse Annex ====
Between 1930 and 1931, the Courthouse was expanded with the construction of a two-story annex at the western end of the building. The annex was designed by architect Harold E. Burkett and built at a cost of approximately $450,000. The annex was designed to mirror the architecture of the main courthouse with a terra cotta facade, copper roof, and bronze door. It provided space for a jail and offices for, among others, the sheriff's department, motor patrol, county board of education, farm bureau, and health department.

One of the most notorious individuals held at the annex's jail was Charles Manson. Manson was arrested in Ventura in April 1968 and held and arraigned there on a drunk driving charge.

==== Elizabeth Duncan trial ====
In 1958, the main courtroom at the Ventura Courthouse was the site of the nationally publicized murder trial of Elizabeth Ann Duncan. Duncan was accused of hiring two men to kidnap and kill her daughter-in-law, a nurse named Olga Duncan. The daughter-in-law was six-and-a-half months pregnant and was beaten with a wrench, pistol-whipped, strangled and dumped in a shallow grave off Casitas Pass Road. The coverage of the trial was so extensive that an extra 150 seats were added to the 99 seats in the courtroom, and a table for dozens of reporters was set up along the front rail. After a five-week trial, which included evidence that Duncan had previously hired a man to pose as her son to seek an annulment of the marriage, Duncan was convicted. After appeals were denied, Duncan and her two co-defendants were executed in the gas chamber in August 1962.

== Renovation and later history ==
=== Finding of structural unsoundness and renovation ===
For nearly six decades, the building served as the center of county government. During that time, the county's population grew by 2,000 percent from 18,347 in 1910 to 376,430 in 1970. The need for a larger government center prompted the County in the early 1960s to acquire 81.7 acres (33.1 ha) in east Ventura at the northeast corner of Victoria Avenue and Telephone Road. The relocation of county government offices to east Ventura was accelerated by concerns about the seismic stability of the downtown courthouse. After a small earthquake in 1968, judges refused to hold court in the main courtroom, expressing concern that the stained-glass dome might crash down on them. (An earthquake in 1954 had caused pieces of plaster to fall from the ceiling in the courtroom and law library.) The County asked a structural engineer, W. D. Crouch Jr., to examine the building, and he concluded that the courthouse was structurally unsafe in the event of an earthquake. In November 1968, the County enacted an evacuation plan to relocate all workers from the building within 90 days. The evacuation was completed in January 1969.

City manager Ed McCombs encouraged the city council to save the building and get grants to rehabilitate the structure. In 1970, the City of Ventura bought the structure for $145,000 with the intention of making it the City Hall. Over a 17-month period from mid-1972 to December 1973, the 45,284-square-foot building was renovated and strengthened at a cost of approximately $3.4 million. Ted Fisher was the architect for the renovation, and MacLeod Construction was the general contractor. Key elements of the renovation included the following:

1. More than 25 percent of the terra cotta tiles on the facade had deteriorated and were replaced. The company that created the original tiles, Gladding, McBean, was still in business though its name had changed to Interpace Co. Interpace still had the plans for the original tiles in its files and used those plans to create the replacement tiles. Each tile weighed 550 pounds and was fired in a kiln at 2,060 degrees. The cost of replacing the terra cotta tiles was $702,000.
2. The building lacked steel reinforcement when built in 1912. Structural reinforcement was achieved by using gunite sprayed concrete to replace an original layer of brick and mortar inside the walls. To attach the terra cotta facade to the new wall structure, small holes were bored, and a newly developed expanding epoxy adhesive was injected inside the walls. Warner Construction Co. of Los Angeles injected approximately 3,000 gallons of the epoxy into the walls.
3. The electrical and plumbing systems were replaced, as were many doors and windows.
4. The large courtroom on the second floor was converted into chambers for Ventura's City Council.

The city received more than $630,000 in federal grants to assist in funding the renovations, and another million dollars was to be obtained through federal revenue sharing funds. The new City Hall was dedicated in a ceremony held on December 29, 1973. It opened for business in early January 1974.

=== Operation as Ventura City Hall (1974–present) ===
The building became Ventura City Hall in January 1974 when the majority of the city's offices were relocated from the former city hall at 625 E. Santa Clara Street to the renovated courthouse. The old city hall had only 12,240 square feet of space, compared to approximately 49,000 square feet in the new city hall.

The city has continued to incur substantial expense to maintain and replace the building's signature, glazed terra cotta tiles. In 1986, the City set aside $1 million for work on the structure, most of that being required to replace 547 damaged tiles on the building's western annex. The new expenditures brought the city's total renovation costs to $8 million. In 2001, the City had a projected $6 million cost to replace additional terra cotta panels that were found to be peeling from trapped moisture.

== In popular culture ==
The building has been a popular shooting location. In 1997, three films were shot there. In June 1989, actor-director Jack Nicholson filmed "The Two Jakes" (sequel to "Chinatown") at the building.

== See also ==
- Statues of Junípero Serra (Ventura, California) – concrete and, later, bronze statues of Junípero Serra, founder of Mission San Buenaventura, erected in front of the courthouse
- National Register of Historic Places listings in Ventura County, California
- California Historical Landmarks in Ventura County, California
- Ventura County Historic Landmarks & Points of Interest
- City of Ventura Historic Landmarks and Districts
