= Peirano Market =

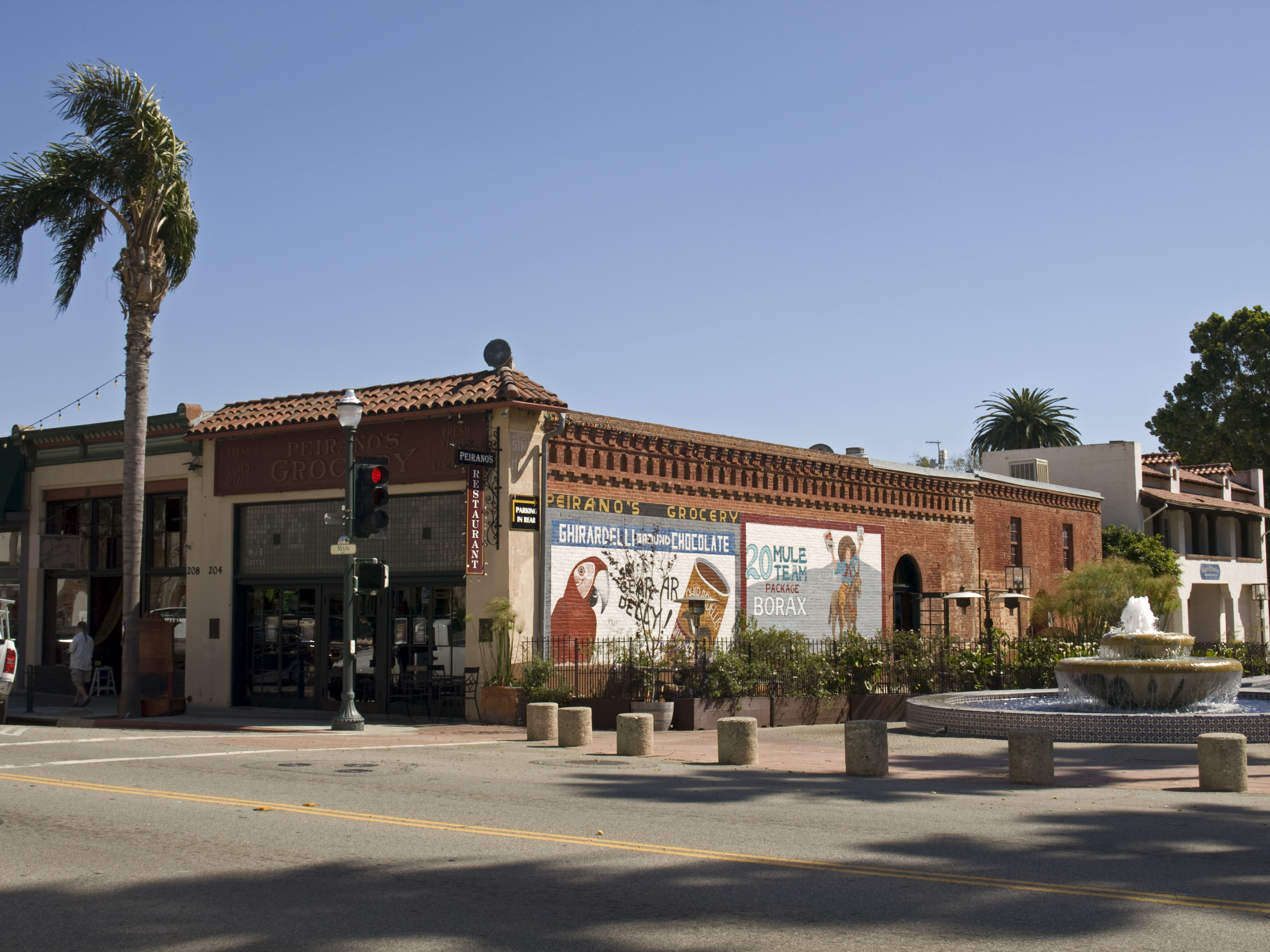
- Peirano Market in 2014
- Interactive map of Peirano Market
- Location: 204 East Main Street, Ventura, California
- Coordinates: 34°16′50″N 119°17′51″W
- Built: 1877

The Peirano Market, also known as Peirano's Grocery and Peirano Store, is a historic building in Ventura, California. Located across the street from the Mission San Buenaventura, the red brick structure was built in 1877 and has ornamental relief brickwork and a mansard, Spanish revival tile roof.

The building housed a general merchandise store and later, a grocery store operated by the Peirano family for more than 100 years from the 1880s to the 1980s. The building was designated in 1978 as City of Ventura Historic Landmark No. 32. In 1991, archaeological remains of the San Buenaventura Mission Lavanderia were discovered beneath the building and were designated as Ventura Historic Landmark No. 85. The building is also a contributing property within the Mission San Buenaventura Historic District.

The Peirano Market building was acquired in 1987 by the San Buenaventura Redevelopment Agency and remained vacant. In 1997, it was sold to a company that refurbished the building. Since then, it has housed various restaurants while also experiencing vacancy.

== Construction and early uses ==
=== Construction and operation by Gandolfo ===
In 1877, J. J. Mahoney constructed the building for Blackburn and Brooks. Mahoney was a prominent Ventura builder during the 1870s; his other works are believed to include the Emmanuel Franz House and the Schiappapietra house.

Alex Gandolfo, an Italian immigrant, was the first tenant of the building. Gandolfo operated a general merchandise and grocery store in the building. An announcement in the Ventura Signal noted that Gandolfo moved into the store in December 1877. Gandolfo was part of a wave of Italian immigration to Ventura in the 1870s that also included the Lagomarsino, Faio, Shiappapietra, and Ferro families.

=== Nick Peirano Sr. ===
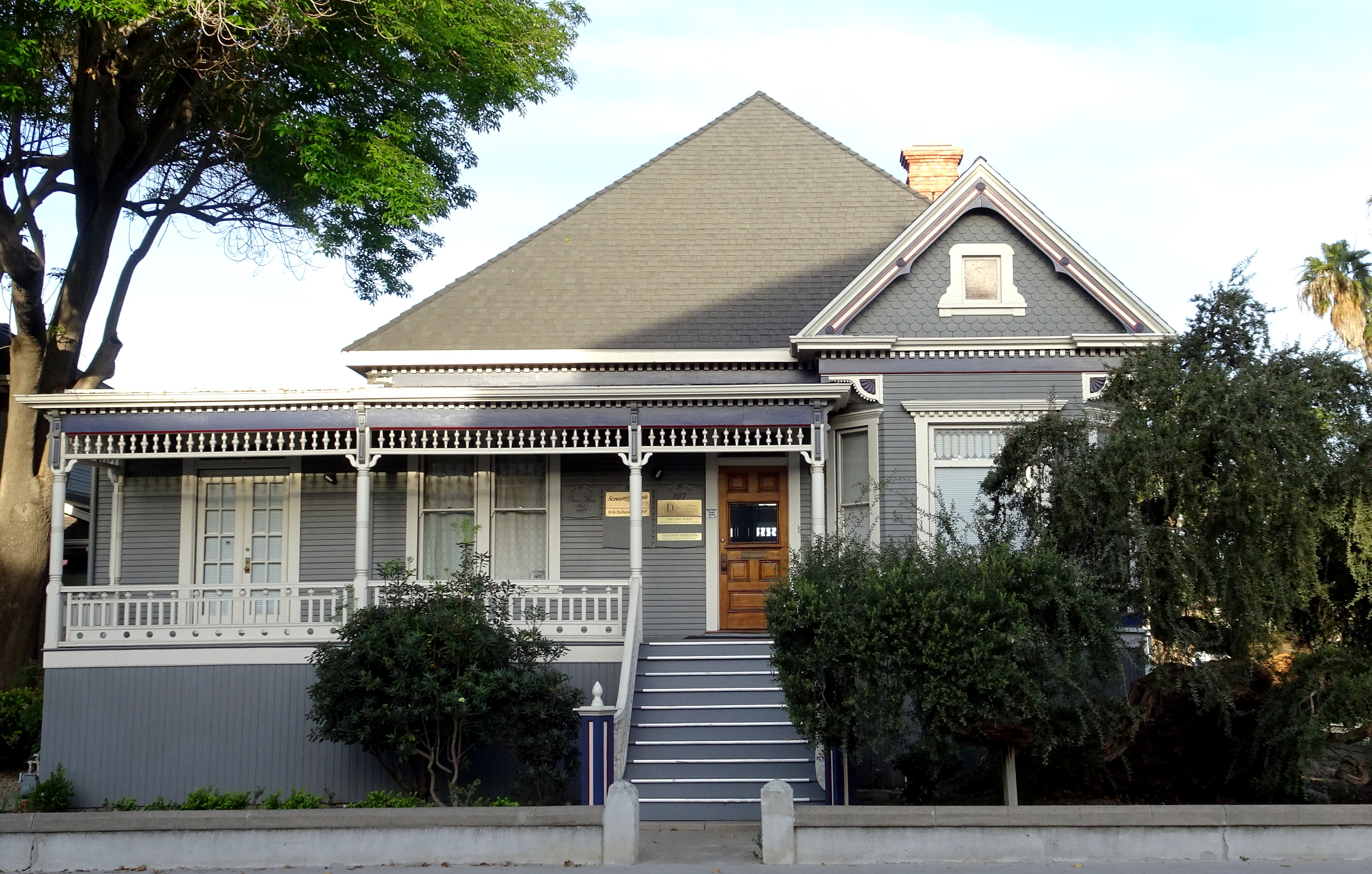
The Nicola Peirano residence built in 1897

In the early 1880s, Nicola "Nick Sr." Peirano (1862–1937), a nephew of Alex Gandolfo, immigrated from Genoa, Italy. Nick worked in Gandolfo's store, slept in a loft at the site, and took over the business in approximately 1888 when Gandolfo left Ventura. In its early years, the store sold everything from groceries to farm implements, wine, liquor, cigars, hardware, bailing wire, shotgun shells, and black powder.

Nick Sr. was married in 1897 to Clara Raffetto, also an Italian immigrant. They had six children, Elvira, Cecilia, Victor, Lester, Elvinia, and Nicholas (Nick Jr.) They raised their family in the Queen Anne style Peirano residence at 107 South Figueroa Street, built for Peirano in 1897 and located one block south of the store.

=== The Peirano brothers ===
In 1931, Nick Jr. (1907–1994) and Victor (1903–1965) took over the business. Under their management, the store moved away from general merchandise and hardware sales and specialized in groceries, adding a home delivery service. Over the years, the Peirano brothers further specialized in Italian groceries, including many varieties of pasta, salami, aged cheeses, semolina flower, Petri cigars, olives, hard beans, and imported canned goods. Customers reportedly drove from three counties to purchase Italian groceries at the store.

Nick Sr. died in 1937, and Victor continued to live in the Peirano residence on Figueroa Street with his mother. The Peirano family owned the residence until 1978. Nick Jr. married Ruby Bounds and moved to a home in Oak View.

In 1965, Victor Peirano died, and Nick Jr. continued to operate the business on his own.

=== One of the last old-time grocery stores ===
The Peirano Market suffered as supermarkets opened and the city's population moved east, but Nick Jr. decided to stay put. He recalled: "That was what was so unique about our store. We didn't change." The business remained popular for its old-fashioned feel, including wallpaper dating to the turn of the 20th century, original sugar-pine flooring, gunny sacks full of fava beans and other staple foods, and a glass case with various pastas. The store was decorated with old cans and bottles, a vintage mail saddlebag behind the meat counter, an antique grandfather's clock received by Nick Sr. in 1904 as a premium for buying five cases of tobacco, a large kerosene lamp with brass shade hanging from the ceiling, a Model T lantern from the store's first delivery truck, and an old fire nozzle. A 1973 story on the market opened: "Nostalgia and Italian delicacies are featured at the corner of Main and Figueroa streets in downtown Ventura."

In 1978, the City of Ventura designated the shop and the Peirano residence (one block south of the shop) as Ventura Historic Landmark Nos. 32 and 33. Nick Jr. had not sought the designation and noted: "I didn't want it to begin with. Now I can't sell the store without giving them 180 days notice. It's just more red tape." The Ventura County Star-Free Press described Nick Jr. himself as "a kind of walking, talking historical landmark in Ventura."

In July 1986, Nick Jr. retired and closed the store.

== Government acquisition and archaeological study ==
=== Purchase by Redevelopment Agency and installation of murals ===
In 1986, the City of Ventura commissioned Linda Lorr (later known as Linda Taylor), an art teacher at Nordhoff High School, to paint large-scale murals in the style of late 19th century advertisements on the building's west-facing exterior wall. Nick Jr. recalled that, in his father's day, the wall was freshly painted every year or so with new advertising, accounting for "the layer-cake of colors" revealed by Lorr's preparation of the wall for her murals. Lorr's murals of advertisements for Ghirardelli chocolate and Borax remain on the west-facing wall.

In 1987, after several months of discussions, the San Buenaventura Redevelopment Agency purchased the building with $83,500 of the agency's funds and a $100,000 grant from the California Office of Historic Preservation. The City and Redevelopment Agency solicited proposals from prospective purchasers or tenants, but its efforts were initially stymied by the cost of earthquake reinforcement work.

=== Archaeological excavation and assessment ===
In 1991, the Redevelopment Agency retained archaeologist Roberta Greenwood of Greenwood and Associates to conduct an archaeological excavation and assessment beneath the Peirano's store and the adjacent Wilson Studio building. After digging a trench below the structures, Greenwood and her colleagues discovered remains of the San Buenaventura Mission Lavanderia. The Lavanderia, since designated as Ventura Historic Landmark No. 85, was a place where Mission Chumash washed clothes and directed water to the nearby gardens. The Lavanderia consisted of a central tank for holding water, buttresses on the sides of the tank, and a complex of drains, gutters, and aqueducts for carrying water to and from the laundry facility. The archaeologists also discovered an abundance of artifacts, including Euroamerican and Mexican ceramics, bottles and glassware, ammunition, and Chinese artifacts, including opium pipes and paraphernalia. In her report, Greenwood stated: "It would be difficult overstate the quantity and diversity of the materials observed." The only Native American artifacts discovered were two fragments of stone bowls.

The discovery of the Lavanderia and other artifacts underneath the building raised questions as to the relative historical importance of the Lavanderia and the Peirano Market and further complicated the city's redevelopment efforts.

== Subsequent development and use ==
=== Lengthy vacancy ===
In 1993, Ventura Realty Co. proposed razing the building, contending that seismic retrofitting would be too expensive. The "Save Peirano's" campaign advanced an alternative plan to convert the building into a museum, art gallery, gift shop, coffee house, deli, and tourist center. Neither proposal came to fruition, and a debate continued as to whether the city should invest substantial funds to retrofit and renovate the building or permit it to be razed as part of a redevelopment effort. The building remained vacant for more than a decade, and concerns grew as homeless people began sneaking into the building at night. These concerns were exacerbated in August 1996 when a fire broke out in an upstairs storage area. The fire was labeled "suspicious" by the fire department.

=== Restaurant uses ===
In 1997, KL Associates of Oxnard purchased the building and spent $720,000 to refurbish it, including seismic work. The exterior of the buildings was preserved and restored, but the interior was not preserved, with the exception of the original wood flooring. The Lavanderia was not part of the new development and was, instead, reinforced with steel beams and buried in sand for preservation.

In August 1998, after sitting idle for more than 10 years, a Mediterranean restaurant, Jonathan's at Peirano's (operated by Jonathan and Sharon Enabnit), opened at the site. In 2011, ownership was transferred to Sanaa Dugan who operated the site as Peirano's Restaurant and the Red Room. Dugan sold the building in October 2015, and the restaurant closed in January 2016.

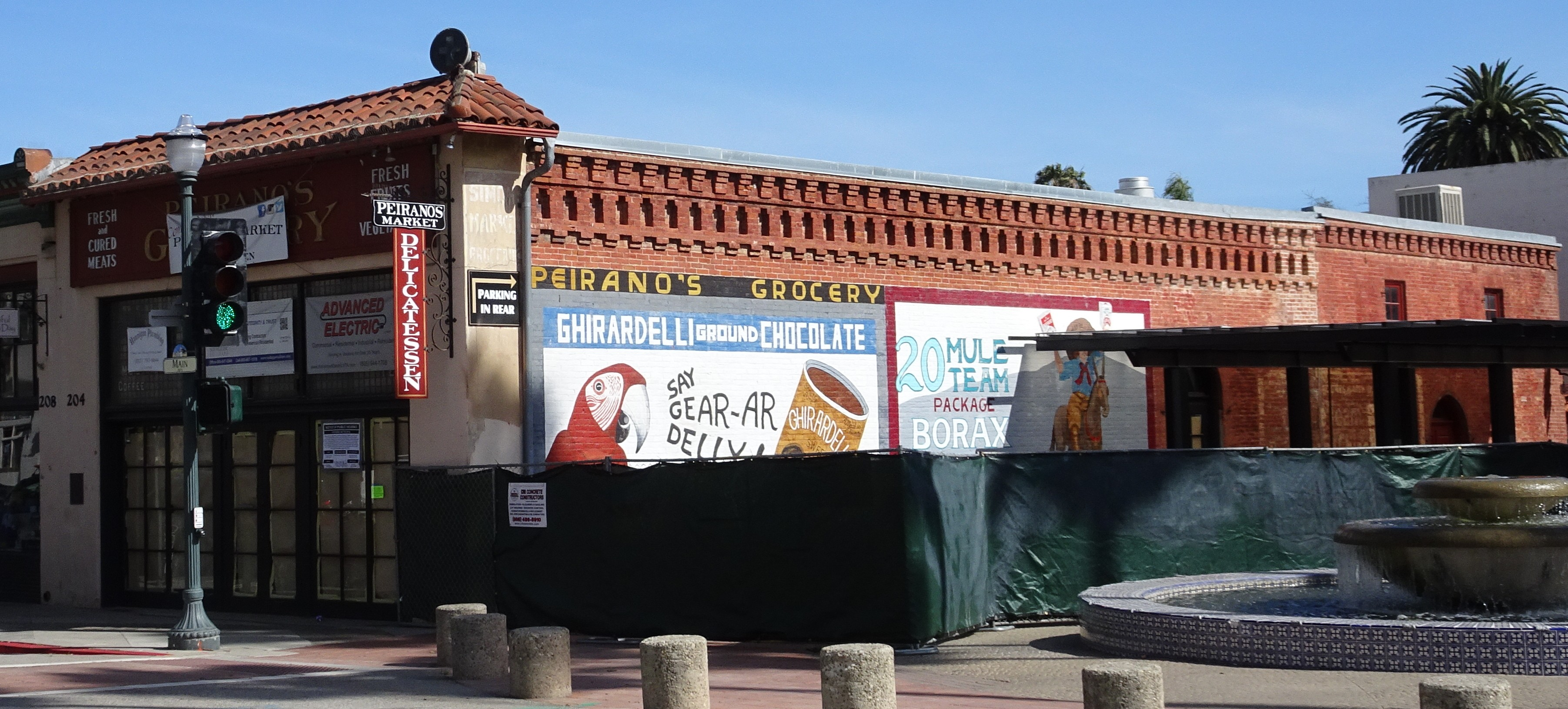
Peirano Market undergoing renovation, April 2018

In 2019, the building reopened as Peirano's Market & Delicatessen. It closed in March 2025.

== See also ==
- City of Ventura Historic Landmarks and Districts
