= Narciso Botello =

American politician (1813–1889)

Narciso Botello (about 1813–1889) was a Californio politician and military officer who served as chief of staff for Mexican general Joaquín Ramírez y Sesma before the Mexican–American War and was the first Southern California member of the California State Assembly after California organized its legislature.

== Personal life ==
Botello was born about 1813 in Real de los Álamos in the Viceroyalty of New Spain. He moved with his brothers to the Pueblo de Los Ángeles in Alta California, in 1832 or 1833, when it was part of independent Mexico.

Shortly after, he married a daughter of General Joaquin Ramirez y Sesma, commandment of the local Mexican military department. In the 1850 United States federal census, he was listed as married to Francisca Ruiz, with two children, Narciso and Francisca. He may also have had a third child, Maria, who is listed in the 1860 census.

Botello died in East Los Angeles on November 20, 1889, at the age of seventy-six. He was survived by a daughter. At that time his home was on Hawkins Street.

== Mexican rule ==
Botello was chief of staff for Ramirez y Sesma. His two brothers also married daughters of the general.

In 1833, he was provisionally granted four square leagues, or 17,706 acres, of the Rancho Santa Maria de Los Peñasquitos, but because he "failed to fulfill the requirements," the rancho was then granted to Jose Joaquin Ortega in 1843.

In 1837, Botello was secretary of the ayuntamiento of Los Angeles. "He was for eight years Jefe de los Archivos of Los Angeles, and served a term as Prefecto.

In 1845, Botello was granted lands of Rancho Ex-Mission San Buenaventura by the Mexican government, as well as to a man named Jose Arnaz. It was later said that the mission's former lands were "illegally sold" to Arnaz.

== Statehood ==
After California became a state in 1850, Botello was the first member of the California Assembly in the California Legislature from the southern part of the state, and he served two terms. Afterward, he was county recorder of Los Angeles County, or, in Spanish, jefe de archivos. He also was a prefeto or judge.

Botello was a member of the Los Angeles Common Council, the governing body of the city, in 1852–53.

In 1856, Botello was a member of several committees of the California Assembly, including one charged with "the use of Spanish missions in California in facilitating resources for war against the United States, revoking mission land grants/sales made by Pico, and continuing to rent the lands."

In 1859, he was a notary public.

== Legacy ==
Botello completed two manuscripts — Anales del Sur de la California and Comunicaciones Sueltas de un Angelino — to which Hubert Howe Bancroft and his team referred in writing the Bancroft histories of California. The former is now at the Bancroft Library. The Anales has been translated into English and published (iUniverse, 2014) as Narciso Botello's Annals of Southern California 1833 - 1847.
