= Dudley House (Ventura, California) =

Historic house in California, United States

- U.S. National Register of Historic Places
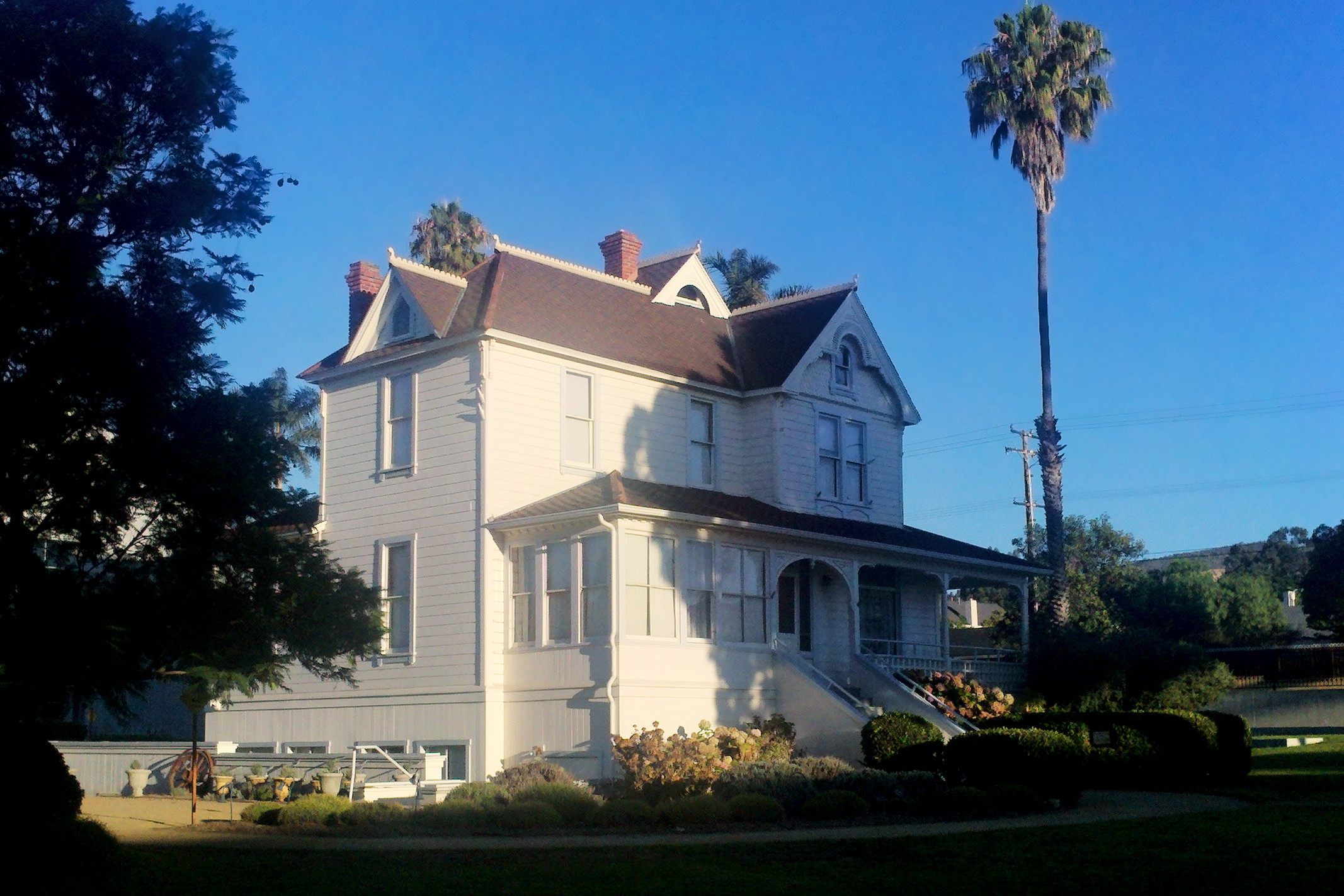

- Location within California Location within the United States
- Location: 197 N. Ashwood Ave, Ventura, California 93003
- Coordinates: 34°16′34″N 119°14′20″W
- Area: 9 acres (3.6 ha)
- Built: 1891
- Architect: Shaw, Selwyn
- Architectural style: Late Victorian
- NRHP reference No.: 77000362
- Added to NRHP: May 12, 1977

Dudley House in Ventura, California is a historic house museum built in 1891 in a Late Victorian-style. Designed and built by local architect and builder Selwyn Shaw, it was listed on the National Register of Historic Places in 1977.

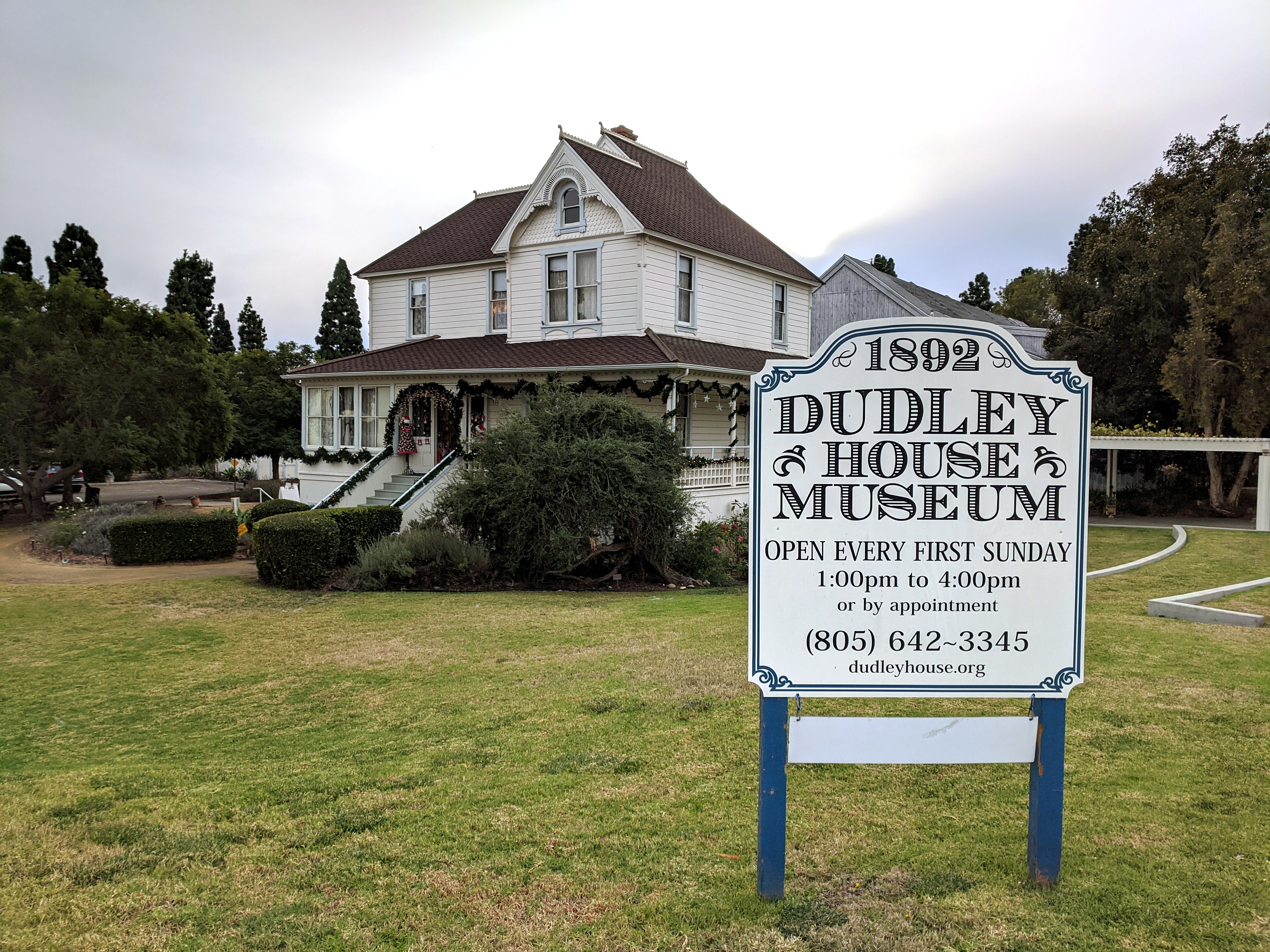
Dudley House Museum with sign

At the time of the NRHP listing, the farmhouse was occupied by the fifth generation of the Dudley family and the property included nine out of an original 200 acres (81 ha). The property was deemed significant for its architecture and for its association with this farming family; it was then the last surviving family farm in the city of Ventura.

Owned by the city of Ventura, the house is managed by San Buenaventura Heritage, Inc. which opens the house for tours on a limited basis.

== See also ==
- City of Ventura Historic Landmarks and Districts
- National Register of Historic Places listings in Ventura County, California
