= Olivas Adobe =

Historic house in California, United States

- U.S. National Register of Historic Places
- California Historical Landmark
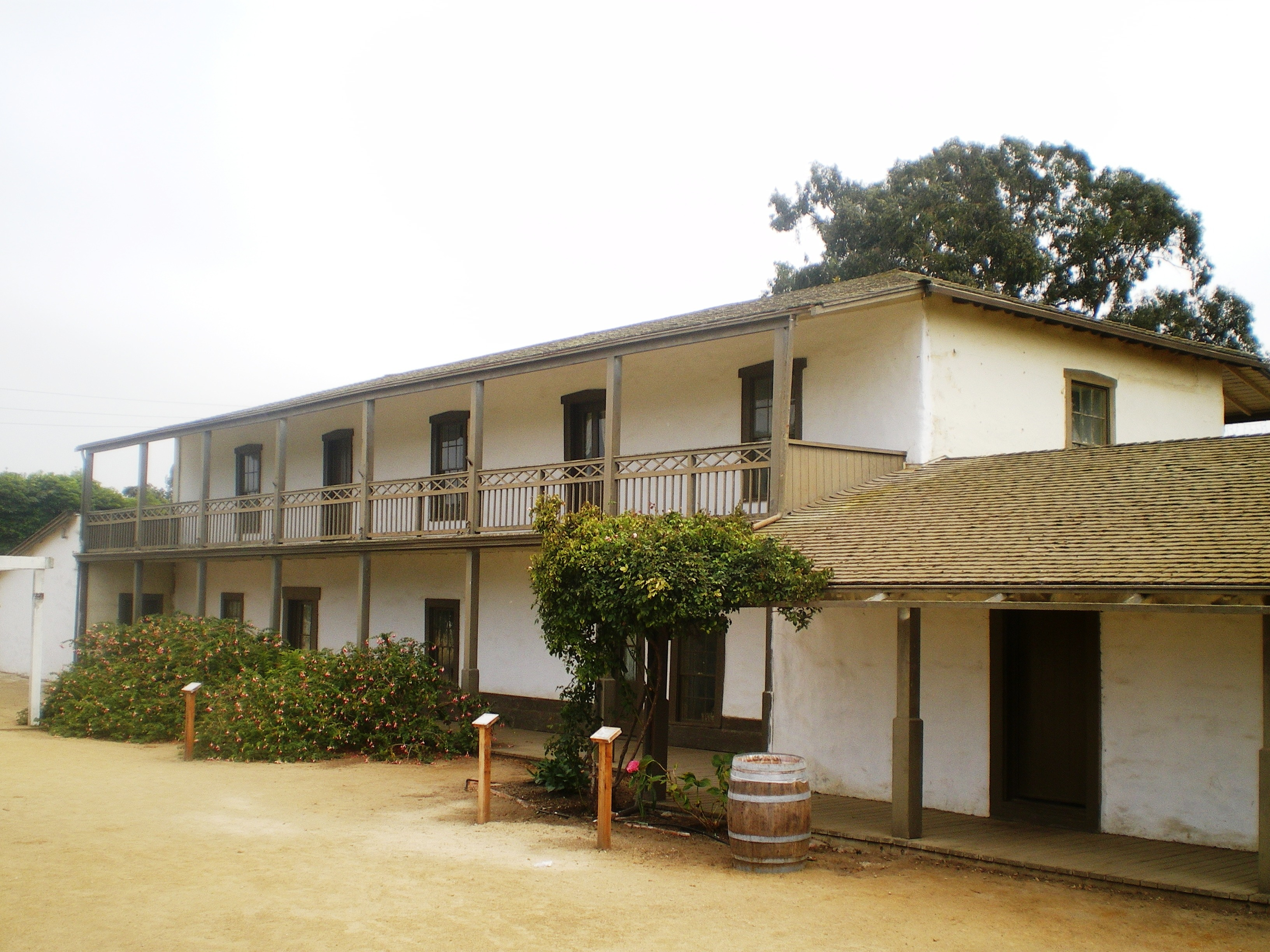
- Olivas Adobe
- Location: 4200 Olivas Park Dr., Ventura, California
- Coordinates: 34°14′40″N 119°14′28″W
- Built: 1837
- Architect: Raimundo Olivas
- NRHP reference No.: 79000570
- CHISL No.: 115

Significant dates
- Added to NRHP: July 24, 1979
- Designated CHISL: 1933

The Olivas Adobe in Ventura, California is an adobe structure built in 1837 by Raymundo Olivas on the north bank of the Santa Clara River about a mile from the estuary where it flows into the Santa Barbara Channel.

Olivas received, in recognition of his service at the Presidio of Santa Barbara, approximately 2,250 acres (9 km^{2}) as part of land grant from Governor Juan Bautista Alvarado in 1841, which he named Rancho San Miguel. The land had originally been part of grazing area for the cattle herds of Mission San Buenaventura but was appropriated during the secularization of the missions lands.

Olivas built the adobe home in 1837, and expanded it in 1849 to two stories, making it the only such building in the area. He and his wife and their 21 children lived here until 1899. It later became Max Fleischmann's hunting lodge (of yeast and margarine fame). After his death, his foundation donated the land and the house to the City of Ventura.

The Olivas Adobe is registered as California Historical Landmark #115 and is listed on the National Register of Historic Places in 1979.

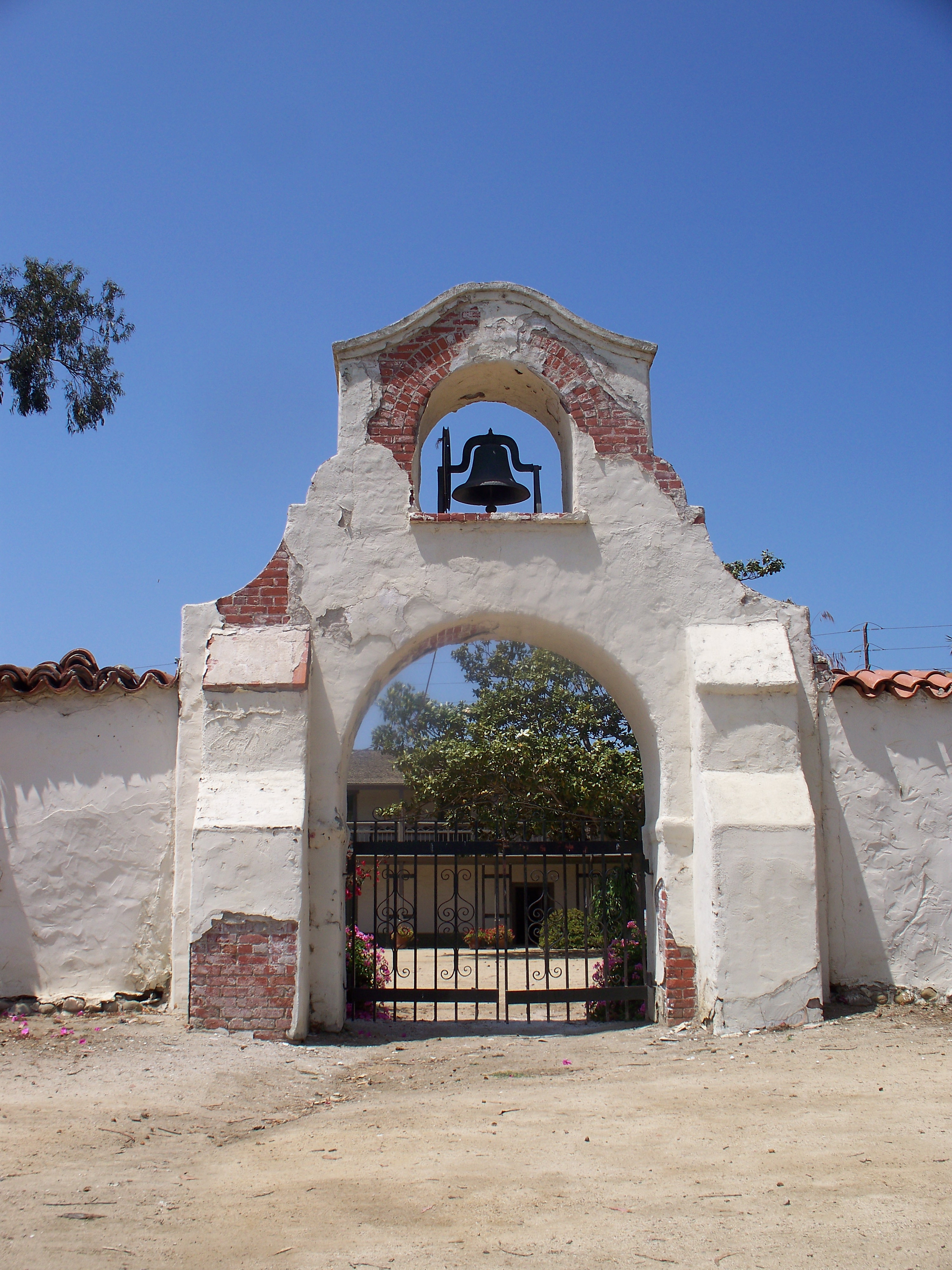

== In popular culture ==
The Star Film Company headed by Gaston Méliès shot a silent film in 1913 here called “The Gringo Strikes” which featured a Robin Hood-like character in old Mexico.

== See also ==
- List of Registered Historic Places in Ventura County, California
- City of Ventura Historic Landmarks and Districts
- Ranchos of California
- Spanish missions in California
