= Higgins Building =

Building in Los Angeles, California

Coordinates: 34.0511°N 118.2449°W

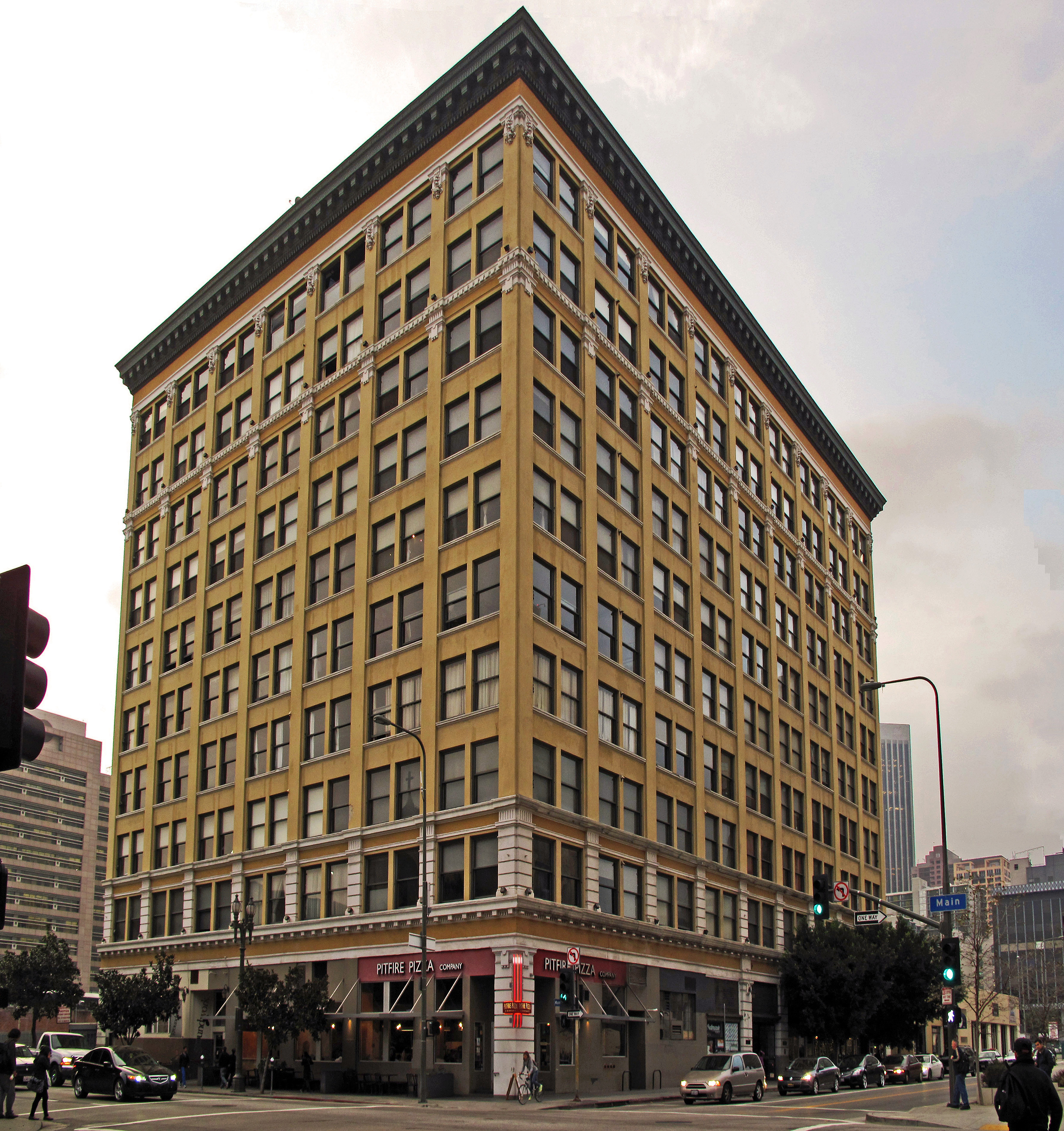
- Former names: County of Los Angeles Engineering Building
- Alternative names: Higgins Lofts

General information
- Type: Offices (1910); Loft condominiums (as of 2005)
- Architectural style: Beaux-Arts
- Location: 108 West 2nd Street, Los Angeles, California 90012, U.S.
- Construction started: 1909
- Completed: 1910
- Inaugurated: 1910
- Renovated: 1998-2006
- Client: Thomas Higgins
- Owner: Thomas Higgins (1910)

Technical details
- Structural system: Reinforced concrete
- Floor count: 10

Design and construction
- Architects: Albert C. Martin, Sr. A.L. Haley

Other information
- Public transit: Historic Broadway

U.S. National Register of Historic Places
- Designated: September 19, 2023
- Reference no.: 100009358

Los Angeles Historic-Cultural Monument
- Designated: 2007
- Reference no.: 873

The Higgins Building is a proto-Modernist concrete framed building rendered in the Beaux-Arts style located in downtown Los Angeles, California. Completed in 1910 by owner Thomas Higgins, an Irish American, the 10-story building was originally used for office space. The Engineers and Architects were Albert C. Martin, Sr. and A.L. Haley. It has been designated as a historical monument by the City as Historic-Cultural Monument #873, and was listed on the National Register of Historic Places in 2023. Although designed as an eight story high building, it was decided during the construction stage to add two additional floors in order to hold the reputation as being the highest building in the city centre.

== Background and development ==
Thomas Higgins was born on July 12, 1844, in Boyle, County Roscommon in Ireland, son of Patrick Higgins, a farmer and Hanora Flanagan. He received some education in Ireland. He traveled out west seeking his fortune in the late 1800s. His first stop was in Troy where he worked in some iron mines. Another member of his family, Mary Keefe (née Higgins), lived there. He worked as a lumberjack in Mosinee, Wisconsin for the years 1867-1870. He worked on dock building in Chicago which was hard heavy work that was poorly paid. On hearing that all the adventurers were heading for the Klondike looking for gold he decided that so many guys were heading that way that there would be no gold for him. He headed south down river to St. Louis. In Louisiana he met some levee contractors from Ireland, and with them became a foreman. During the summer they worked for the Iron Mountain Railway. He then decided to head west, towards the Rocky Mountains and stayed alive by avoiding Indian attacks by not sleeping beside his open fire at night. He prospected for gold and diamonds in Oregon and Washington without much success. He heard that there were fortunes to be won in Peru and Arizona and tossed a coin to decide which direction to go. There were three towns in Arizona at that time, Tucson, Prescott and Phoenix. He reached Bisbee near the Mexican border in 1877 where he found a rich vein of copper which he worked until 1900. In the early 1900s he moved to 1199 Magnolia Avenue in Los Angeles, from where he ran a property business. Tom Higgins visited Ireland in 1907. He was a philanthropist and supported Boyle Heights Orphanage, St. Thomas's Church in Pico Heights, and St. Vincent's College. He died at his home in Los Angeles on March 15, 1920, at the age of 76. The cause of death was diabetes, and a requiem high mass was held for him on March 18 at St. Thomas's Church, at Pico and Mariposa streets.

In July 1903 Higgins paid ,000 in cash for the southwest corner of Second and Main streets, a lot of 120 by 159 feet then occupied by a two-story brick business building, and had the architect A. L. Haley prepare plans for its improvement. In January 1910, with construction under way, Higgins instructed Haley to extend the building to ten stories, adding 68 offices at a cost of ,000 and bringing the total investment to over ,000. The Los Angeles Times described it as "one of the best examples of monolithic concrete construction in the United States", fireproof throughout, with interior trim of metal finished to look like hardwood.

The building was designed with natural air conditioning, using a ventilation shaft that allowed sunshine and fresh air to filter into offices. The Los Angeles Times reported in 2006: "The building's grand size, marble-lined hallways, zinc-lined doors and window frames, black-and-white mosaic tile lobby and 'wholesome and healthful' water -- purified through filters in the sub-basement -- attracted prominent businessmen. [Albert C.] Martin [Sr.], who would emerge as one of the most successful architects and structural engineers in Southern California, based his company there for 35 years."

== Previous tenants ==
General Petroleum occupied six floors of the building for 15 years beginning in 1934. The building also housed the Los Angeles County Engineer Department for 25 years from 1952 until 1977. In addition to its architect Albert C. Martin, Sr., previous tenants included Clarence Darrow as well as the chancery office of the Roman Catholic Archdiocese of Los Angeles.

== Renovation ==
After spending many years derelict and underwater, the building was finally rescued by entrepreneurs Andrew Meieran and Marc Smith. Developer Barry Shy converted the upstairs offices into rental lofts in 2003 (later converted to condominiums in 2005); and Meieran and Smith opened The Edison in 2007, a post-industrial steampunk-styled nightclub in the building's basement. The Higgins Building has also been a filming location for films and television series.
