= The Edison =

Nightclub in Los Angeles, California

- Logo of The Edison
- Interactive map of The Edison
- Location: Los Angeles, California, U.S.
- Coordinates: 34°3′3.7″N 118°14′42″W
- Type: Nightclub
- Event: Steampunk

Construction
- Opened: 2007

Website
- edisondowntown.com

The Edison is a steampunk themed nightclub located inside the Higgins Building basement in Los Angeles, California. The Edison opened in 2007. The Higgins Building was built by Thomas Higgins. After spending several years derelict and underwater, it was rescued by entrepreneurs Andrew Meieran and Marc Smith, who made a post-industrial steampunk venue for Los Angeles nightclubbers. It is known for having a rooftop aquarium.
