= Rancho Ex-Mission San Buenaventura =

Mexican land grant in Ventura County, California

Coordinates: 34.360°N 119.150°W

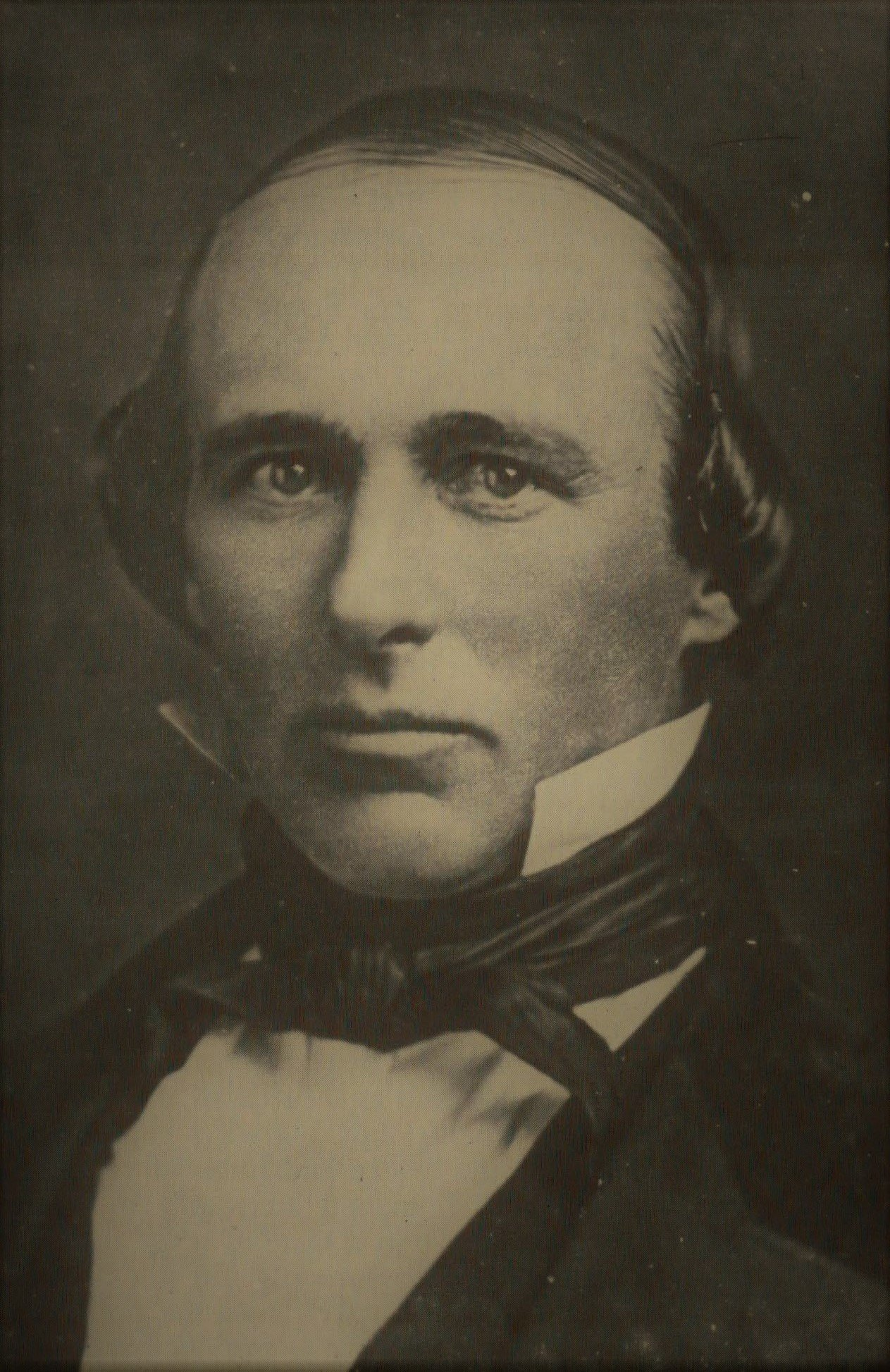
Don José de Arnaz was granted Rancho Ex-Mission San Buenaventura in 1846.

Rancho Ex-Mission San Buenaventura was a 48,823-acre (197.58 km^{2}) Mexican land grant in present-day Ventura County, California given in 1846 by Governor Pío Pico to José de Arnaz. The grant derives its name from the secularized Mission San Buenaventura, and was called ex-Mission because of a division made of the lands held in the name of the Mission — the church retaining the grounds immediately around, and all of the lands outside of this are called ex-Mission lands. The grant extended east from present day Ventura, excluding the Rancho San Miguel (Olivas) lands, inland up the Santa Clara River to Santa Paula, between the north bank of the River and Sulphur Mountain.

== History ==
José de Arnaz (1820–1895), born in Spain, was a trader along the California coast. He opened a store in Los Angeles, and married María Mercedes de Ávila (1832–1867), the niece of Antonio Ygnacio Ávila, in 1847. With his partner, Narciso Botello, Arnaz leased the extensive lands of Ex-Mission San Buenaventura. In 1846, Governor Pío Pico granted the twelve square league Rancho Ex-Mission San Buenaventura to Arnaz. Later it was claimed that the grant had been sold (which would not have been legal) by Pío Pico to Arnaz. During the Mexican–American War, the Arnaz ownership was not recognized. When Colonel Stevenson arrived in the southern part of California in 1847, he took possession in the name of United States, of the Arnaz land and put the property in the custody of another lessee. In 1849, Arnaz bought part of Rancho Rincon de los Bueyes in Los Angeles, and sold Rancho Ex-Mission San Buenaventura to Manuel Antonio Rodríguez de Poli in 1850.

With the cession of California to the United States following the Mexican-American War, the 1848 Treaty of Guadalupe Hidalgo provided that the land grants would be honored. As required by the Land Act of 1851, a claim for Rancho Ex-Mission San Buenaventura was filed with the Public Land Commission in 1852, and the grant was patented to Manuel Antonio Rodriguez de Poli in 1874.

Poli sold the property to the San Buenaventura Commercial, Manufacturing and Mining Company. In 1874, the Rancho Ex-Mission San Buenaventura not yet owned by settlers was sold to Rudolph Steinbach & Horace W. Carpentier. After the patent was issued, a dispute arose over the boundary between Rancho Ex-Mission San Buenaventura and the adjacent Rancho Santa Paula y Saticoy.

== See also ==
- List of California Ranchos
- Ranchos of Ventura County, California
- History of Ventura County, California
