= Pierpont Inn =

Building in California, USA

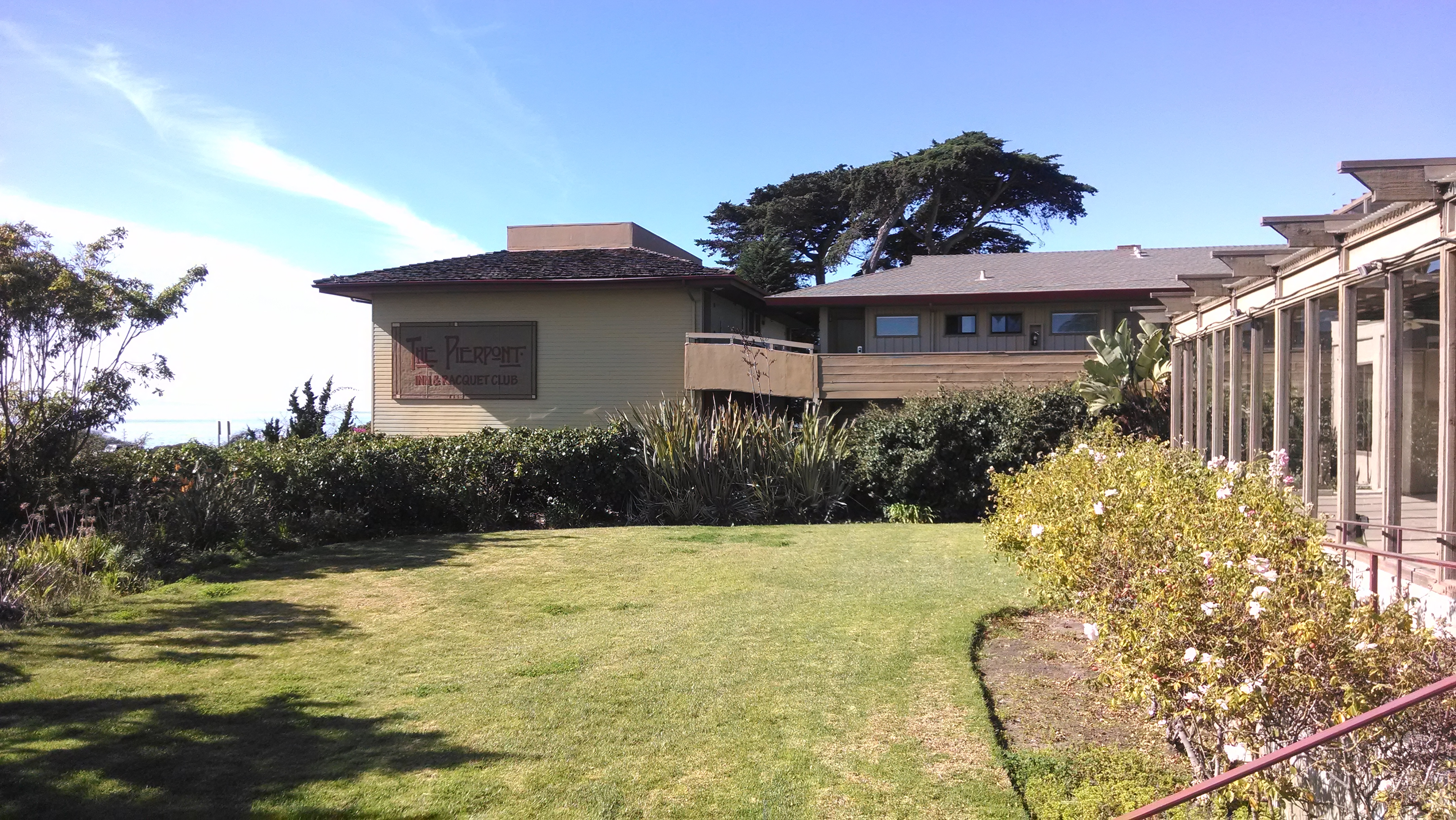
- Bluff top view over Pacific Ocean
- Interactive map of the Pierpont Inn area

General information
- Location: 550 Sanjon Road, Ventura, California, US 93001
- Coordinates: 34°16′24″N 119°17′00″W
- Opening: September 1910
- Owner: FPC LLC
- Operator: Three Thrones Hospitality

Design and construction
- Architect: Sumner P. Hunt
- Developer: Josephine Pierpont
- Designations: Ventura Historic Landmark No. 80

Other information
- Number of rooms: 86
- Number of restaurants: 1

Website
- www.pierpontinn.com//

The Pierpont Inn is a Craftsman bungalow-style hotel in Ventura, California, United States, on a bluff overlooking the Santa Barbara Channel. Built in 1910 for motoring tourists, the complex is City of San Buenaventura Historic Landmark Number 80. Josephine Pierpont thought the site on a bluff overlooking the ocean could serve the increasing number of automobile enthusiasts who would travel along the Pacific Coast looking for a place to rest.

== History ==
In 1908, Josephine Pierpont bought land on a bluff overlooking the ocean in Ventura, California for development as a site for an inn. She felt the inn could serve the increasing number of automobile enthusiasts who would travel along the Pacific Coast looking for a place to rest and enjoy a home-cooked meal. She hired Sumner P. Hunt to build a Craftsman Style bungalow inn on the site. It opened in September 1910, originally as "The Wayside Inn", later changed to "The Pierpont Inn".

Josephine's son Austen Pierpont ran the Inn for the first many years, expanding it in 1925 by adding two English Tudor-style cottages surrounded by a lush, garden setting. He also developed the idea of turning the inn into a country club, but the idea never came to fruition.

The inn changed hands several times and fell into disrepair until it was rescued by Mattie Vickers Gleichmann in 1928. After Mattie's husband, professional baseball player Gus Gleichmann, was forced to leave the sport after being injured, they decided to pursue a career in hospitality. Mattie borrowed $80,000 from her father Ashby Christian Vickers, a prominent Ventura farmer, to purchase and renovate the inn. It reopened in 1929 as a family affair, as her husband, mother, sister, brother-in-law and children all worked on and around the property.

In 1938, Gus Gleichmann was killed in an automobile accident and Mattie decided to continue operation of the Inn without him to fulfill the dream of being able to provide a future for their children. This dream became a reality when her son Ted returned from World War II and embraced the role of general manager. Ted Gleichmann brought modernization to the Inn and added an East Wing with 12 guestrooms including fireplaces in 1954. Architect Robert R. Jones designed the Mattie Gleichmann House (50's Flat) in 1953 and the two-story East Wing in 1957-58.

Later Ted added the Bluff House and West Wing to bring the total number of rooms to 72. In addition to his duties at the Inn, Ted was a championship-winning, amateur PGA golfer. Among his victories was the 1963 Bing Crosby Invitational Tournament (now known as the AT&T Pebble Beach Pro-Am). Through his success in the golf world, he attracted many of his famous social contacts to the Inn.

In the 1950s, the Ventura Freeway was built below the bluff that the Inn sits on.

In 1976, Spencer and Scott Garrett (grandchildren of Mattie Gleichmann's sister) leased the then-vacant parcel of land adjacent to the Inn to build one of the nation's first multi-purpose athletic facilities, "The Pierpont Racquet Club". After Mattie's death in 1996 at the age of 100, the Inn was eventually sold to the Garretts. In 2005 the Garretts sold the inn to Central Coast Management Inc. In 2009, Central Coast Management Inc. sold the inn to the Pierpont Group LLC, headed by investor Grace S. Ahn.

The Pierpont Inn and Spa became a member of Historic Hotels of America, the official program of the National Trust for Historic Preservation, in 2002.

The property went into bankruptcy auction in late 2012 and the Inn transferred from the Ahn Family Trust to Brighton Management. Wyndham Garden Ventura Pierpont Inn was the new name selected when Brighton Management signed a franchise agreement with Wyndham's national reservation system in December 2013. Renovations to the rooms and grounds were needed after a period of neglect. In 2015, DKN Hotels acquired the property and stated that the renovations would continue along with remaining under the Wyndham franchise. Three Thrones Hospitality, who took over the property, proposed updating, refurbishing, and renovating the hotel in 2023.

== Notable guests ==
The Inn was a playground for elite society. Tinsel-town notables such as Cecil B. DeMille, Bette Davis, Edward G. Robinson and Charlie Chaplin all took breaks from filming in Hollywood by escaping to the charming location.

The property was also a hideaway for scandalous lovers such as Clark Gable & Carole Lombard and Humphrey Bogart & Lauren Bacall, many of whom, because they were married to others, desired to have their privacy protected. The Inn's remote location provided the perfect venue to escape the limelight.

Local attorney Erle Stanley Gardner authored his "Perry Mason" series in his law office down the road from the Inn and actually used it as a backdrop for many of his novels, particularly in "The Case of the Velvet Claws." George H. W. Bush along with wife Barbara (with their son George W. Bush in tow) spent considerable time at the Inn between 1949-1950 while Bush senior was apprenticing in the oil business.

== See also ==
- City of Ventura Historic Landmarks and Districts
