= Rancho San Miguel (Olivas) =

Mexican land grant in Ventura County, California

Coordinates: 34.270°N 119.260°W

Rancho San Miguel was a 4,694-acre (19.00 km^{2}) Mexican land grant in present-day Ventura County, California given in 1841 by Governor Juan Bautista Alvarado to Felipe Lorenzana and Raymundo Olivas. The grant encompassed the area of present-day City of Ventura not within Rancho Ex-Mission San Buenaventura, with the Santa Clara River marking its southern boundary.

== History ==
Felipe Lorenzana was one of the orphans who traveled from Mexico City to California, 1799–1800. Lorenzana married María de Natividad Ruiz. Raymundo Olivas (1801-1879), born in Los Angeles, joined the Mexican Army at the age of 16 and was assigned to the Presidio of Santa Barbara. Raymundo married Teodora Lopez in Santa Barbara in 1832. They had 21 children - eight girls and thirteen boys. In return for their army service, Olivas and Lorenzana, were granted one and a half square leagues in 1841.

With the cession of California to the United States following the Mexican-American War, the 1848 Treaty of Guadalupe Hidalgo provided that the land grants would be honored. As required by the Land Act of 1851, a claim for Rancho San Miguel was filed with the Public Land Commission in 1852, and the grant was patented to Raymundo Olivas and Felipe Lorenzana in 1873.

In 1864, Felipe Lorenzana sold his half of the Rancho to Dixie W. Thompson. Raymundo Olivas died in 1879, and his half of the Rancho was divided amongst his heirs.

== Historic sites of the Rancho ==
- Olivas Adobe. Adobe home built in 1841 by Raymundo Olivas.
