= Feraud General Merchandise Store =

- U.S. National Register of Historic Places
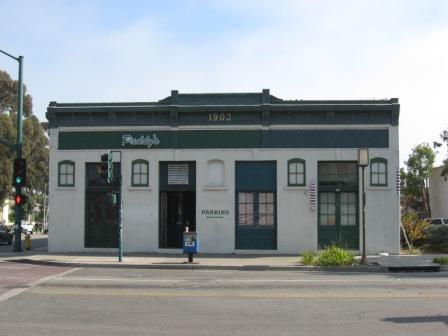

- Location within California Location within the United States
- Location: 2 and 12 W. Main St., Ventura, California
- Coordinates: 34°16′51″N 119°18′3.5″W
- Built: 1903
- Architect: H.A. Giddings
- NRHP reference No.: 86000109
- Added to NRHP: January 23, 1986

Feraud General Merchandise Store, also known as 1903 Building, was built in 1903 in Ventura, California. Jules Feraud opened the Feraud Bakery and Grocery Store and the bakery stayed in the family until 1944. The brick building is a rare intact example of turn-of-the-century commercial architecture during Second Land Boom (1887 – 1905) after the tracks of the Southern Pacific Railroad arrived in Ventura. The City Council of Ventura designated the building Historic Landmark Number 35 by resolution on July 17, 1978. The building was listed on the National Register of Historic Places in 1986.

== Location and notable uses ==
The building was originally occupied by a general merchandise store and bakery operated by Jules Feraud, an immigrant from France. Feraud moved to Ventura in 1875, became a partner in the Ventura Bakery on Main Street, and eventually bought out his partner. By 1890, Feraud had moved his bakery, which by then also included a grocery store and saloon, to a wood-frame structure on the southwest corner of Main Street and Ventura Avenue. In 1903, Feraud built a new and larger brick structure on the site. In the new building, Feraud operated a grocery, bakery, feed and hay warehouse. In later years, Feraud was assisted in operating the business by his sons, Anselmo, Frank, Charles, Ernest, and Anthony. Jules retired in 1927 and died in 1929 at age 78. Frank Feraud continued operating the store until at least 1941.

From the mid-1940s until 1970, the building was operated as an automotive center.

The primary address is 2 W. Main Street where a bar currently operates. 12 W. Main Street became a barbershop in the mid-1940s where Phillip E. Marquez "Phil the Barber" operated for 63 years. Phil the Barber retired in 2010 at the age of 96 and died on February 15, 2011. His family was among the original settlers of what was known as "Tortilla Flats" and he was considered a local icon cutting hair for generations of Venturans on the West Side. The Mayor Of Ventura declared June 5, 2011 "Phil Marquez Day" The Store currently operates as Artisan Soap and Bath store, but has photos of Phil donated by the Marquez Family on Display. There are also two addresses, 25 and 35 south Ventura Avenue, along the side of the building.

The building now houses Paddy's Bar and Lounge.

== Historical context ==
The Mission San Buenaventura is about two blocks east of the building as the early commercial district was centered around the mission including the extant Arcade Building, 38-50 west Main Street, that is just west of the Feraud building. These buildings are just outside the Mission Historic District that lies on the other side of Ventura Avenue to the east.

== Gallery ==
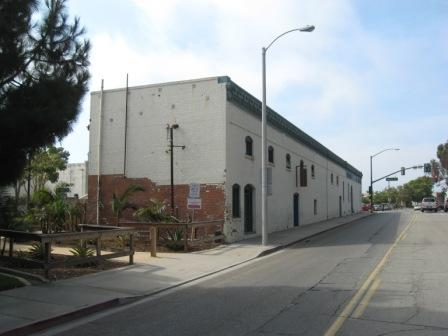
It's a very long L-shaped building.

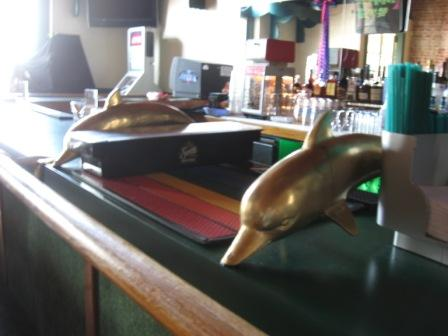
2 W. Main St. currently operates as a bar.

== See also ==
- City of Ventura Historic Landmarks and Districts
- National Register of Historic Places listings in Ventura County, California
