= Albert C. Martin Sr. =

Albert C. Martin
- Born: September 16, 1879; LaSalle, Illinois, US
- Died: April 9, 1960 (aged 80); Los Angeles, California, US
- Education: University of Illinois Urbana-Champaign
- Occupation: Architect
- Buildings: Los Angeles City Hall; St. Vincent de Paul Church; May Company Department Store (Wilshire Bl.); Million Dollar Theater; Ventura County Courthouse

Albert Carey Martin (September 16, 1879 – April 9, 1960) was an American architect and engineer. He founded the firm Albert C. Martin & Associates, now known as A.C. Martin Partners, and designed numerous landmark buildings in Southern California. Martin also developed a system of reinforced concrete construction, along with reinforced brick masonry.

== Early life and education ==
Martin was born in LaSalle, Illinois on September 18, 1879. He received his Bachelor of Science degree in architectural engineering from the University of Illinois Urbana-Champaign in 1902.

== Career ==
Martin began his career as a draftsman at Brown-Ketcham Iron Works in Indianapolis, Indiana. He also worked for the Pennsylvania Railroad and Cambria Steel Company.

Martin moved to Los Angeles in 1904, where he worked as a construction superintendent for Carl Leonardt & Company, then worked as an engineer for Alfred Rosenheim. Martin formed his own firm, Albert C. Martin & Associates, in 1906.

Martin developed a system of reinforced concrete construction in 1907 and a method of reinforced brick masonry in 1933, both of which were meant to help safeguard buildings against earthquakes.

=== Recognition ===
In 1959, the Los Angeles Chamber of Commerce awarded Martin its annual "Man of Achievement" award, in recognition for his contributions to the development of Los Angeles.

=== List of works ===
Martin and his associates designed an estimated 1,500 buildings. His notable buildings include:

==== In Los Angeles ====
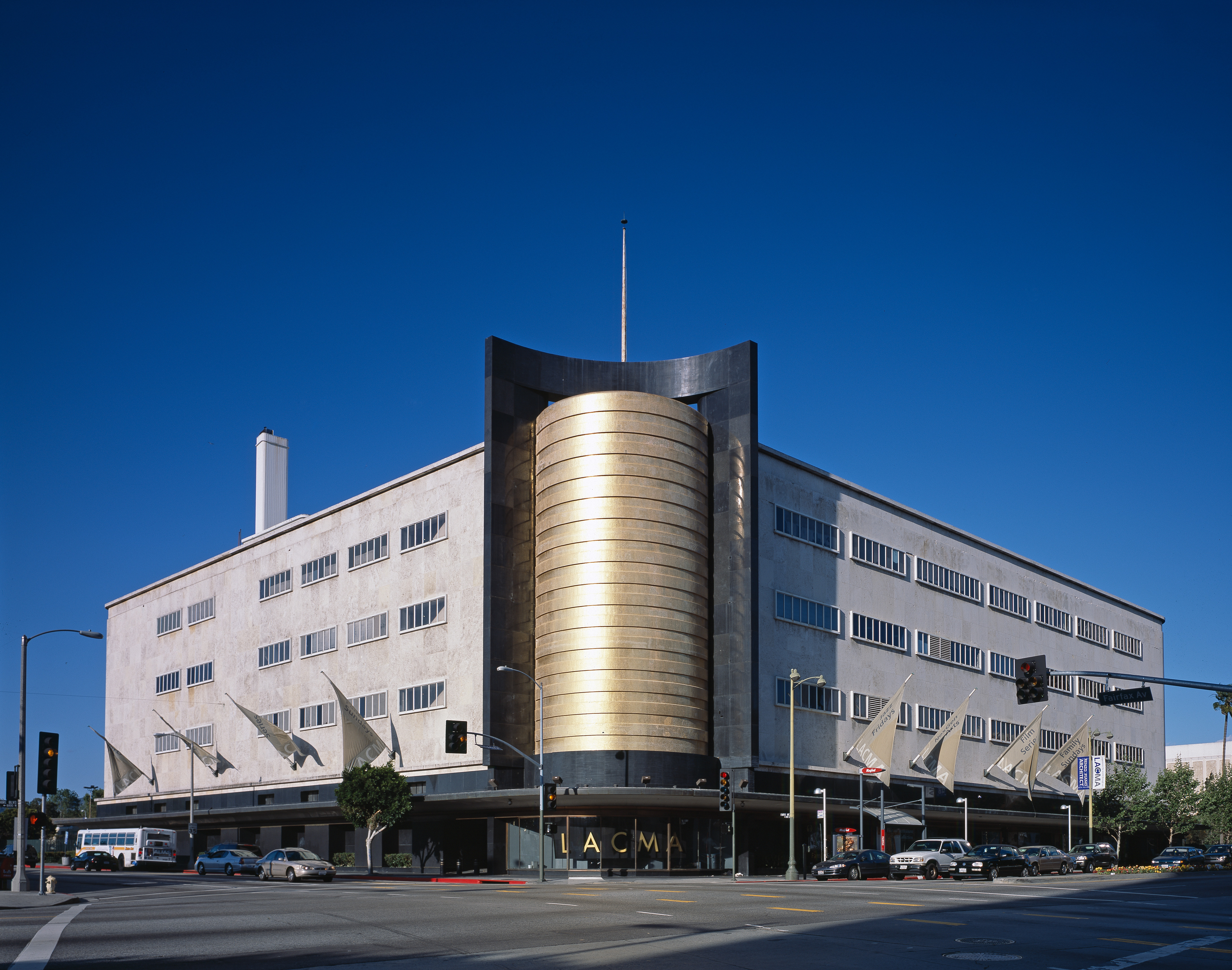
May Company Wilshire

- 2nd Church of Christ, Scientist (1908)
- Higgins Building (1910), LAHCM No. 873
- Million Dollar Theater (1917), LAHCM No. 1184, NRHP-listed
- Sunset Pier Recreation Complex (1921)
- Desmond's Building (1924), LAHCM No. 1207, NRHP-listed
- St. Vincent's Catholic Church (1925), LAHCM No. 90
- Queen of Angels Hospital (1926)
- Los Angeles City Hall (1928), with John Parkinson and John C. Austin, LAHCM No. 150
- Brunswig Drug Company Factory (1931)
- Lincoln High School (1937 reconstruction)
- May Company Wilshire (1939), LAHCM No. 566
- Union Hardware Building (1947)

==== Elsewhere in California ====
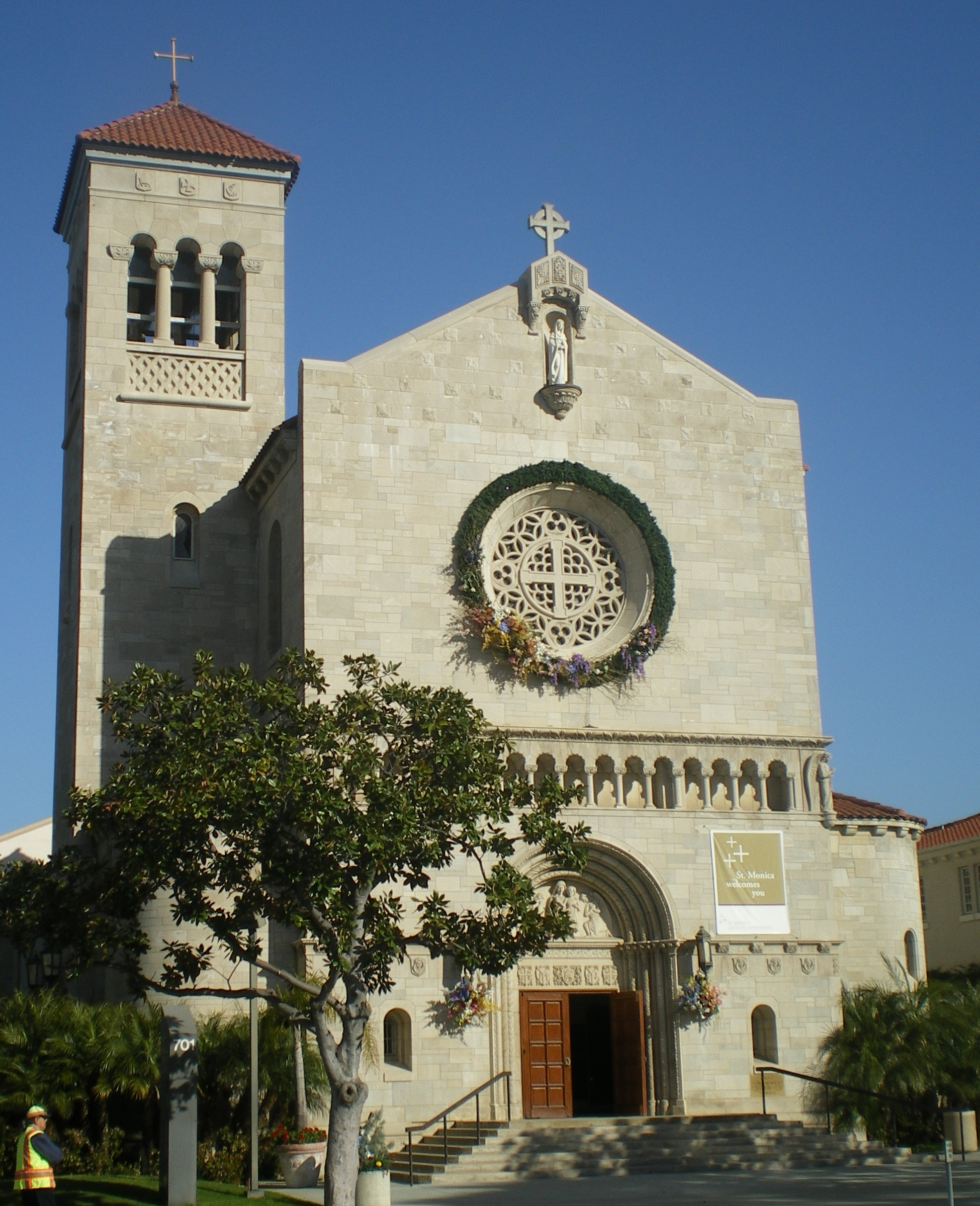
St. Monica Catholic Church

- St. Alphonsus Catholic Church, Fresno (1913)
- Ventura County Courthouse, Ventura (1913), NRHP-listed
- St. Monica Catholic Church, Santa Monica (1926)
- Furnace Creek Inn, Death Valley (1935), NRHP-listed
- Lakewood Center, Lakewood (1952)
- Daniel Freeman Memorial Hospital, Inglewood (1954)

== Personal life and death ==
Martin married Carolyn E. Borchard (February 21, 1883–June 9, 1959) in Oxnard, California on October 16, 1907. They had six children, including architect Albert C. Martin Jr., who went into business with his father, and J. Edward Martin (October 23, 1916 – November 22, 2004), a structural engineer who assumed management of his father's firm after World War II.

Albert C. Martin died at age 80 in Los Angeles.
