= Emmanuel Franz House =

Historic house in California, United States

- U.S. National Register of Historic Places
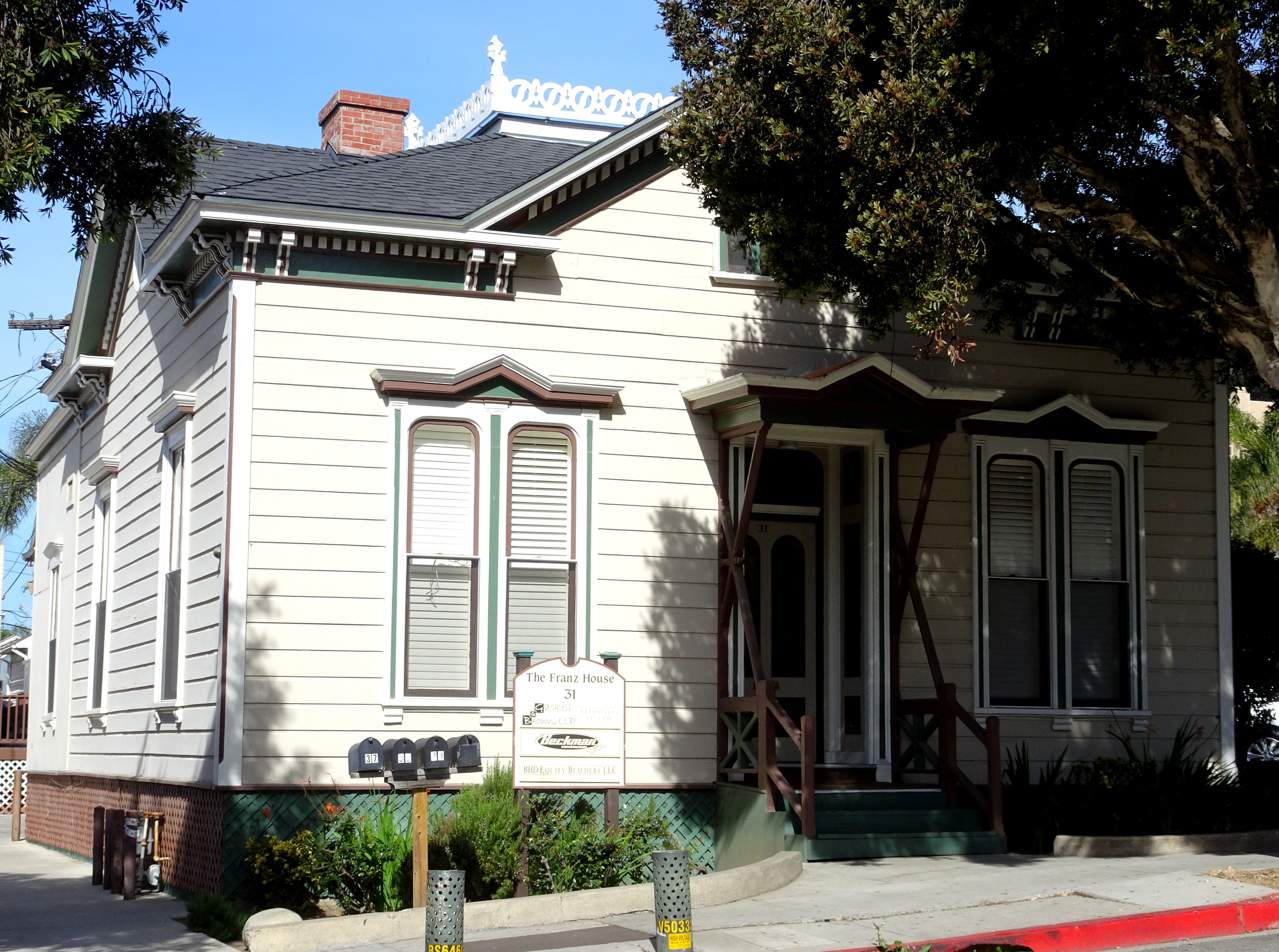
- The 1880s Italianate Victorian Emmanuel Franz House in Ventura, California

- Location within California Location within the United States
- Location: 31 N. Oak St., Ventura, California
- Coordinates: 34°16′52.6″N 119°17′41.5″W
- Built: 1879–1891
- Architectural style: Italianate Victorian
- NRHP reference No.: 82002282
- Added to NRHP: June 25, 1982

The Emmanuel Franz House is an Italianate style Victorian historical residence located within downtown Ventura, in coastal Ventura County, California.

The wood and brick Franz House was built from 1879 to 1891. The house has an interesting front stoop and widow's watch.

The City Council of Ventura designated this building Historic Landmark Number 21 by resolution on March 29, 1976. The house was listed in 1982 on the National Register of Historic Places.

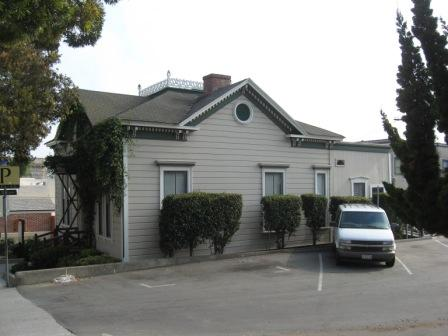
The Victorian Franz House, side view with Italianate trim, in Ventura, California

== See also ==
- City of Ventura Historic Landmarks and Districts
- National Register of Historic Places listings in Ventura County, California
