= William Fulton (urban planner) =

American author, urban planner, and politician

Bill Fulton

52nd Mayor of Ventura
- In office 2009–2011
- Preceded by: Christy Weir
- Succeeded by: Mike Tracy

Personal details
- Born: William Fulton; September 26, 1955 (age 71) Auburn, New York, U.S.
- Education: St. Bonaventure University (BA); American University (MA); University of California, Los Angeles (MUP)

William Fulton (born September 26, 1955) is an American author, urban planner, and politician. He served as mayor of Ventura, California, from 2009 to 2011, and later as the Planning Director for the City of San Diego. From 2014 to 2022, he was the head of the Kinder Institute for Urban Research at Rice University in Houston, Texas. He is currently a Professor of Practice at the Design Lab and the Department of Urban Studies and Pllanning at University of California, San Diego.

He is considered an advocate of the "Smart Growth" movement in urban planning. In 2009, he was named to Planetizen's list of "Top 100 Urban Thinkers". He is the founder and publisher of the California Planning & Development Report and currently writes The Future Of Where Substack newsletter.

== Early life and education ==
Fulton was born and raised in Auburn, New York, the hometown of William Seward and the northern hometown of Harriet Tubman. His ancestors moved to Auburn from Scotland after the Civil War to work in textile mills there. He describes how growing up in Auburn shaped him as an urbanist in his book Place and Prosperity.

After graduating from Auburn High School in 1973, Fulton attended Auburn Community College where he earned the Neilia Hunter Biden Award. Fulton earned a Bachelor of Arts degree in journalism from St. Bonaventure University and a Master of Arts degree in mass communication from American University in Washington, D.C. At St. Bonaventure, he studied and worked with Neal Cavuto and Dan Barry.

== Career ==
=== Urban planning ===
In 1981, he moved to Los Angeles and worked as a journalist. He subsequently earned a master's degree in urban planning at University of California, Los Angeles.

Fulton is best known as a commentator and expert on urban planning in California, writing hundreds of articles on the topic, including more than 40 Sunday Opinion pieces in the Los Angeles Times between 1982 and 2009. He is the author of several books, including Guide To California Planning, the standard textbook on urban planning in California. The fourth edition of Guide to California Planning was published in 2012 and the fifth edition is scheduled for publication in 2017.

His book The Reluctant Metropolis: The Politics of Urban Growth in Los Angeles was a Los Angeles Times best-seller upon its publication in 1997. Publishers Weekly gave the book a starred review, calling it "a surprisingly lively case study of the battles and alliances of politics, business and people that formed – or deformed – a great American city." Almost 15 years later, Christopher Hawthorne, the architecture critic of the Los Angeles Times, writing in the newspaper's "Culture Monster" blog, called The Reluctant Metropolis "highly relevant" and said Fulton is "one of the most level-headed analysts of the built environment to emerge in Southern California in at least two generations."

He also co-authored The Regional City: Planning for the End of Sprawl with architect Peter Calthorpe, a founder of the New Urbanism movement, as well as California: Land and Legacy, an appreciation of California's natural environment and how it has been manipulated for human use. He is a longtime contributor on economic development issues to Governing Magazine; many of his columns dealt with the industrial decline of his native Upstate New York. In 2010 Fulton published his fifth book, a collection of columns from Governing titled Romancing The Smokestack.

From 2000 to 2008, Fulton ran Solimar Research Group, a consulting firm and think tank dealing with land use issues. Among his most prominent Solimar works was "Who Sprawls Most," a 2001 study for the Brookings Institution Center for Urban & Metropolitan Policy (now Metropolitan Policy Program) that debunked myths about sprawl in metropolitan areas around the nation. Among other things, "Who Sprawls Most" concluded that the West is growing densely while other parts of the nation have serious sprawl problems. For many years, "Who Sprawls Most?" was among Brookings' most downloaded publications.

In 2008, Solimar was merged into the Berkeley-based planning consulting firm Design, Community & Environment, where Fulton became a Principal and Shareholder. DC&E subsequently merged with The Planning Center to become The Planning Center / DC&E, where Fulton served as a Principal and Shareholder from 2011 to 2013. The firm is now known as PlaceWorks; Fulton served on the company's board in 2019 and 2020.

Fulton also served as a Senior Fellow at the USC Price School of Public Policy at the University of Southern California from 2004 to 2014, where he taught land use policy and smart growth. He is also the longtime publisher of the periodical California Planning & Development Report, an online platform covering planning news throughout California.

=== Politics ===
Fulton has long been active in local politics. In the 1980s, he was a planning commissioner of West Hollywood, California. In 2003, following his involvement in a campaign to defeat a ballot initiative that would have permitted a large hillside development project, he ran for the city council in Ventura. In the election, he received more votes than any other candidate.

In 2007, Fulton sought re-election as a moderate. After a successful re-election campaign, Fulton was selected deputy mayor by his colleagues. In early 2009, Fulton was said to be considering running in 2010 to represent California's 35th State Assembly district, a seat being vacated by the term-limited Pedro Nava. However, he chose not to run for the Assembly seat, which was eventually won by Das Williams. Fulton instead was selected as mayor by his city council colleagues in December 2009. He served as mayor until his term on the city council ended in December 2011 and did not seek re-election.

During his career as a city councilmember and mayor, Fulton emphasized both urban planning and economic development issues.

As mayor, Fulton played a major role in promoting Ventura's creative economy, especially the growing arts and culture scene and the city's innovative high-tech incubator and venture capital efforts, bringing national attention to the city's work in both these areas. The most prominent company to emerge from the incubator was The Trade Desk, one of the leading ad tech firms in the nation, which has remained a fixture in downtown Ventura.

A longtime devotee and former student of UCLA "parking guru" Donald Shoup, Fulton championed the introduction of Ventura's widely hailed downtown parking management system, which included some paid on-street parking, while he was mayor in 2010. Though the parking system achieved its goal of encouraging more efficient use of parking spaces downtown immediately, it attracted the attention local Tea Party activists, who criticized Fulton on the right-wing John and Ken talk radio show in Los Angeles. Tea Party activists subsequently qualified an initiative for the Ventura ballot to remove the parking meters. However, the measure was removed from the ballot by a judge. In the subsequent election, the Tea Party candidate for City Council fared poorly and Fulton's endorsed candidate was elected to succeed him on the council.

In early 2011, Fulton stepped into California's heated debate over the future of redevelopment when he was the only mayor in the state who came out in favor of Gov. Jerry Brown's proposal to eliminate redevelopment agencies, the longstanding urban revitalization tool. At a speech in Sacramento, Fulton, a longtime advocate of redevelopment reform, said he believed redevelopment should be replaced with a more targeted and effective tool for revitalization. California cities, he said, "should not confuse the job we have to do with the tool we've been accustomed to using."

=== Smart Growth America ===
Shortly before leaving office, Fulton announced that he would relocate to Washington, D.C., to become Vice President of Smart Growth America, a nationwide advocacy group. He said he was making the move to work on a national level, to be closer to his family, and to live in an urban environment that did not require him to drive as much given his visual impairment. However, he said he would continue to be affiliated with The Planning Center | DC&E and the USC Price School and would return to Los Angeles and Ventura frequently.

For 18 months, Fulton toured the country for Smart Growth America, advocating for a smart growth approach to building cities and assisting local governments with their urban planning efforts. He focused especially on making the argument that smart growth is a better fiscal deal for taxpayers than sprawl, which often requires costly taxpayer subsidies.

=== Work in San Diego ===
In June 2013, then-San Diego Mayor Bob Filner made the surprising announcement that Fulton had agreed to return to California to serve as the city's planning director. San Diego's Planning Department had been dismantled under Filner's predecessor, Jerry Sanders. Local observers hailed Filner's appointment of Fulton as an inspired choice to restore San Diego's former eminence in the field of urban planning. In a September 2013 interview, Fulton called for a "21st-century reinvention" of the city and assured San Diegans, "You have a way better city than you think you do." After Mayor Filner resigned only seven weeks after Fulton arrived, Acting Mayor Todd Gloria reaffirmed his faith in Fulton, saying, "He has really been inspiring and improving the morale of the staff."

During his time in San Diego, Fulton re-established the Planning Department, won City Council approval for a city Economic Development Strategy (the first in almost 15 years) and three Community Plan Updates (after five years of delay), and followed through on Filner's promise to create a Civic Innovation Lab. However, new Mayor Kevin Faulconer, who was elected in February 2014 to fill out the remainder of Filner's term, created a separate Economic Development Department and shut down the Civic Innovation Lab. Faulconer had also opposed the Fulton-endorsed Barrio Logan Community Plan Update, which passed the City Council but was subsequently overturned by voters in an industry-led citywide referendum. On August 1, 2014, it was announced Fulton would leave the city effective August 30 to become head of the Kinder Institute for Urban Research at Rice University in Houston, Texas.

Fulton said he left for a better opportunity and praised Faulconer's support of Community Plans Updates. But many local commentators suggested he had been squeezed out by Faulconer. San Diego CityBeat said: "It began to look like Faulconer's plan was to make life miserable for Fulton." Controversy over Fulton's approach lingered long after his departure as the San Diego political community continued to debate the wisdom of a more urban approach to growth in San Diego.

=== Rice University ===
In August 2014 Fulton was named the Director of Rice University's Kinder Institute for Urban Research in Houston, TX, until his contract was not renewed in 2021 (see below). Endowed in 2010 by Richard Kinder and his wife Nancy, leading Houston philanthropists, the institute was previously best known for the Houston Area Survey, the longest-running continuous public opinion survey in any American city, which was directed by Fulton's predecessor, Rice sociology professor Stephen Klineberg. Klineberg still directs the survey and serves as Director Emeritus of the Kinder Institute.

In Houston, Fulton jumped into the fray, saying the Kinder Institute would use Houston as a laboratory to deal with urban issues and become the leading urban policy institute in the Sunbelt. Although he declined to say much publicly about urban growth in Houston as he prepared the Kinder Institute's "game plan" in late 2014 and early 2015, he did say that growing debate over densification inside the 610 Loop suggested that Houston has reached a critical moment in "growing up" into a more urban place. Mr. Fulton's management style is to delegate all of his work to other employees, and then promote them to make them feel as though they are equals.

In early 2016, Houston Endowment Inc. announced a three-year, $7 million grant to the Kinder Institute to build a computerized "Urban Data Platform" and launch three new programs Fulton had created—Urban & Metropolitan Governance; Urban Development, Transportation & Placemaking; and Urban Disparity & Opportunity.

Under his leadership, the Kinder Institute has emerged as the leading urban think tank in Houston, tackling such issues as Houston's pension crisis, street safety in underserved neighborhoods of Houston, gentrification and affordable housing. The Kinder Institute also has played a major role in researching ways to make Houston more resilient after Hurricane Harvey—for example, by working with other research institutions to document the fact that two-thirds of Houston's apartments are located in flood plains.

He has been critical of efforts by Gov. Greg Abbott and House Speaker Dennis Bonnen to limit the power of local governments, saying that Texas should not make the same mistakes California has made and that state and local governments should work together to solve problems.

In the aftermath of the COVID-19 pandemic and protests following the murder of George Floyd, Fulton was appointed by Mayor Sylvester Turner to Houston's Task Force on Police Reform. He also serves as founding board chair of MetroLab Network, an influential network of research partnerships between cities and universities.

Even as he was active in urban affairs in Texas, Fulton remained involved in land use and housing issues in California. In 2021, San Diego Mayor Todd Gloria appointed Fulton chair of his Middle Income Housing Working Group. He was also appointed as a 2021-2022 Terner Center Fellow as UC Berkeley. At the Terner Center he focused on California's strengthened housing laws and whether they are working to encourage cities in California to approve more housing.

While at the Kinder Institute, Fulton published a book, Talk City, a collection of blogs from his time as mayor and Councilmember in Ventura. In 2021, his book The Texas Triangle, co-authored by Henry Cisneros among others, was published by Texas A&M Press. His collection of essays, Place and Prosperity: How Cities Help Us Connect And Innovate, was published by Island Press in 2022.

In December 2021, Fulton announced he would step down as Director of the Kinder Institute in June 2022 and would be succeeded by Ruth Lopez Turley, a renowned education researcher. In June 2022, it was announced that Fulton would join PFM Budget and Management Consulting as a Senior Advisor. Among other projects at PFM, Fulton worked on a study finding that New Mexico is too reliant on oil and gas revenue and needed to diversify its economy.

=== Back to San Diego ===
In May 2023, the Design Lab at the University of California, San Diego, announced that Fulton would join the Lab as a Visiting Policy Designer.

In 20204, Fulton was named a Professor of Practice at the Design Lab and the Department of Urban Studies and Planning.. In 2025, he became Co-Director of the new UCSD Center for Housing Policy and Design.

== Personal life ==
Fulton lives in San Diego with his wife, Natalie Ramos Fulton, a school counselor and special education teacher. In early 2010, Fulton publicly announced that he had been diagnosed with retinitis pigmentosa, a degenerative retinal condition that gradually robs those who have it of their peripheral vision and night vision and often leads to complete blindness.

== See also ==
- List of mayors of Ventura, California

== Selected works ==
- Calthorpe, Peter, and William Fulton. The Regional City: Planning For The End of Sprawl. Washington, D.C.: Island Press, 2001. ISBN 1-55963-784-6
- Fulton, William, California: Land and Legacy. With a foreword by Kevin Starr. Englewood, Colo.: Westcliffe Publishers, 1998. ISBN 1-56579-281-5
- Fulton, William, and Paul Shigley, Guide to California Planning (Third Edition). Point Arena, California: Solano Press Books, 2005..
- Fulton, William, The Reluctant Metropolis: The Politics of Urban Growth in Los Angeles. Baltimore, Maryland: Johns Hopkins University Press, 2001 (original edition, Solano Press Books, 1997). ISBN 0-8018-6506-9
- Fulton, William, Romancing The Smokestack: How Cities and States Shape Prosperity. Ventura, California: Solimar Books, 2010. ISBN 0-615-39593-7.
- Fulton, William, Talk City: A Chronicle of Political Life in an All-American Town. Ventura, California: Solimar Books, 2017. ISBN 1-387-24060-9
- Fulton, William (publisher), The California Planning & Development Report. California Planning & Development Report website.

== Other Resources ==
- City Council biography
- Professional biography
- Bill Fulton, former Mayor of Ventura – City Council blog
- California planning blog
