= Temple Beth Torah (Ventura, California) =

Reform Jewish synagogue

Religion
- Ecclesiastical or organizational status: Synagogue
- Status: Active

Location
- Location: Ventura, California
- Country: United States
- Interactive map of Temple Beth Torah
- Coordinates: 34.2874°N 119.1946°W

Architecture
- Established: 1938

Temple Beth Torah is a Reform Jewish synagogue in Ventura, California. It was founded in 1938 as the Ventura County Jewish Council.

== History ==
The Ventura County Jewish Council was formed in 1938 by Jewish merchants in Ventura. Early meetings were held in a room at a Coca-Cola bottling plant in Ventura. In 1943, the group moved to a former dairy on Channel Drive, which became the first permanent Jewish community center in the county.

In the early 1960s, the congregation purchased land on Foothill Road and began construction of a new facility in 1962.

The congregation moved into the building in 1963, at which time it was formally designated as a synagogue and adopted the name Temple Beth Torah.

By 1988, the congregation had grown to more than 400 families and was described as Ventura's only temple at the time. It operated religious education programs and served the Jewish community of Ventura County. The congregation celebrated its 75th anniversary in 2013.

Ralph Moses, whose family helped found the Ventura County Jewish Council in 1938, later served as cantor and remained active in the congregation for decades.

Rabbi Lisa Hochberg-Miller joined the congregation in 1997. In 2007, a profile marked her first decade of leadership and discussed the congregation's educational and community initiatives. In 2015, the Jewish Daily Forward named Rabbi Lisa Hochberg-Miller among the 33 Most Inspiring Rabbis in America.

== Affiliation ==
Temple Beth Torah is affiliated with the Union for Reform Judaism.
