= Plaza Park (Ventura, California) =

Historic urban park in Ventura, California

Coordinates: 34°16′44″N 119°17′27″W

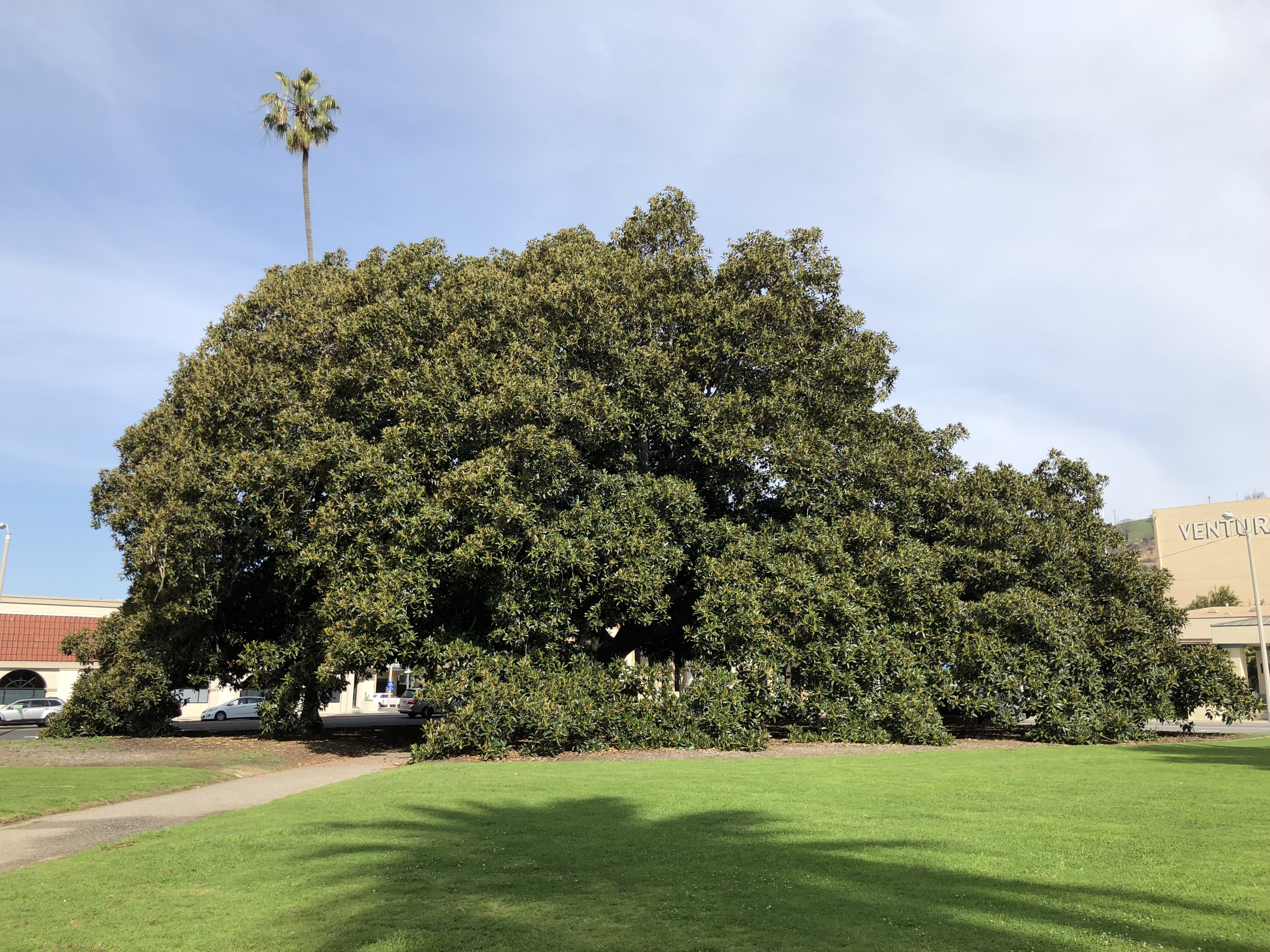
- Plaza Park's historic Moreton Bay fig tree.
- Type: Urban park
- Location: Santa Clara Street & Chestnut Street, Ventura, California
- Area: 3.67 acres (1.49 ha)
- Created: c. 1870
- Operated by: City of Ventura Department of Parks & Recreation

Plaza Park, also known as Cannon Park, is a public park in Ventura, California. It is the oldest park in Ventura and contains numerous historic landmarks like one of the state's oldest and largest Moreton Bay fig trees and a monumental cannon.

== History ==
The plaza appears in an official survey of Ventura in 1869 at the start of the city's first land boom. It is one of the first planned landscape features of the city. In this initial period, the park was used for grazing livestock.

The plaza's Moreton Bay fig tree was planted in 1874 which by the 1990s had grown to a height of over 70 feet and a spread of 128 feet, becoming a local historical landmark and one of the oldest and largest specimens in the state.

The plaza in an 1892 Sanborn map, at the top right.

An 1892 Sanborn map shows cross-diagonal gravel footpaths in the park along with a bandstand and a central fountain. In 1903, a city beautification league was formed in Ventura. The league led the planting of new trees in the plaza in 1906 and 1908 as well as street paving projects. It was a location of a rally held by Theodore Roosevelt for his presidential campaign. A gazebo in the park was torn down before World War II.

A historical bronze cannon serves as a veterans' memorial in the plaza. The cannon was made in a church-run foundry in the Philippines during its occupation by the Spanish Empire; it was inscribed San Buenaventura, apparently after the then newly founded mission in Alta California. It was originally mounted in Fort Santiago, Manila, and remained there until 1898, when it was captured by U.S. forces during the Spanish-American War. It then remained in a military scrap pile in San Pedro, California. The cannon was spotted by a Ventura city official in 1902 and the City Council made a request that the Navy give it to the city; it arrived in Ventura in 1903 and was placed in the Plaza Park as a memorial.

Numerous historic properties surround the park. The Mitchell Block borders the park in the south across Thompson Boulevard with eight historic Victorian brick residences, including the three-story eclectic-style Mary Mitchell home; the block has formed a historic district with the park. North of the park across Santa Clara Street is the city's post office which contains a mural by Gordon Grant, painted in 1936 as a WPA project.

In 2018, a pine tree in the park was carved into a sculpture of a phoenix by arborist and artist John Mahoney. It was made as an homage to the city after the 2017 Thomas Fire.

== Amenities ==
The park contains restrooms, picnic tables, a playground, a gazebo and is an attraction as a historic site. Street parking is available for visitors.
