= List of mayors of Ventura, California =

Mayor of Ventura
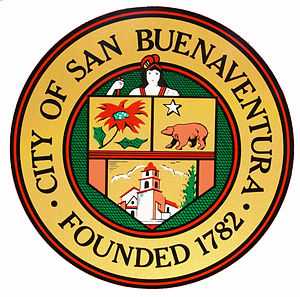
- Seal of Ventura
- Incumbent; Dr. Jeannette Sanchez-Palacios since December 17, 2024
- Term length: 2 years
- Formation: 1866
- First holder: Walter Scott Chaffee

This is a list of mayors of Ventura, California, beginning with Ventura's incorporation as a city in 1866.

The individual who had the longest tenure in office was Charles W. Petit, who served as mayor for 15 1/2 years from 1953 to 1969. When Petit left office, he was, at age 87, the oldest mayor in the United States. Prior to Petit, the mayor with the longest tenure was John S. Collins, who held the position for 14 years from 1890 to 1904.

The first woman to serve as mayor was Harriet Kosmo Henson, who served two terms from 1978 to 1982. Since that time, four other women have served as mayor: Christy Weir (2007–2009), Cheryl Heitmann (2013–2015), Sofia Rubalcava (2020-2022), and most recently, Dr. Jeannette Sanchez-Palacios (2024-present).

The current mayor is Dr. Jeannette Sanchez Palacio, who assumed the position in December 2024.

#	Name	Term	Notes	Sources
1	Walter Scott Chaffee	4/2/1866–1/2/1867	Chaffee was born in 1835 in Madison County, New York. He moved to Ventura in 1860 and, in 1863, he opened a general merchandise and hardware store at Main and Palm Streets. The city was incorporated on April 2, 1866. The initial board of trustees first board of trustees included Chaffee, Angel G. Escandon (who represented the area in the California Legislature), and Juan Camarillo. Chafee died in 1894.	
2	Ysidro Obiols	1/2/1867–4/22/1867	Born c. 1822. Obiols ran a hotel, saloon and stage depot in Ventura. In 1866, upon the incorporation of Ventura, he became the city's first justice of the peace. In January 1867, he became the second president of the city's board of trustees.	
3	Fernando Tico Jr.	4/22/1867–5/18/1868	Born 1836, son of the recipient of a Spanish land grant referred to as Rancho Ojai	
4	Angel Gonzales Escandon	5/18/1868–10/10/1869	Born 1833; died 1884. He also represented Ventura in the California Legislature.	
5	Jesse Allen Shaw	11/10/1869–4/4/1870	Born 1827 in Rupert, Vermont; father of Selwyn Shaw. Died 1919 in Ventura.	
6	C. H. Bailey	4/4/1870–2/25/1871	Merchant born in Massachusetts c. 1827.	
7	Lemuel Clarke McKeeby	2/25/1871–11/3/1873	Born in New York City in 1825. Moved to Ventura in October 1866 and was one of the organizers of the Bank of Ventura. Died 1913.	
8	E. M. Jones	11/3/1873–3/25/1874		
9	P. V. McCarty	3/25/1874–9/10/1874		
10	William Ayres	9/10/1874–3/18/1876		
11	Angel S. Escandon	3/18/1876–1/7/1878		
12	Henry Spear	1/7/1878–1/3/1882		
13	T. H. Daley	1/3/1882–1/4/1886		
14	Paul Charlebois	1/4/1886–1/6/1890	Born in Montreal in 1855. Moved to Ventura from San Francisco in 1871. Owner of a hardware store. Also served as Ventura County Treasurer in 1888 and as Ventura County Sheriff from 1894 to 1903. Died in 1914.	
15	John S. Collins	1/6/1890–1/4/1904	His 14-year tenure as mayor was the longest in city history until Charles w. Petit served for 15 1/2 years.	
16	W. L. Lewis	1/4/1904–4/15/1907		
17	William McGuire	4/15/1907–9/21/1908		
18	Floyd Putnam Shaw	2/23/1910–4/18/1911	Born c. 1858 in Wisconsin. Son of Jesse Allen Shaw and brother of Selwyn Shaw. The family moved to Ventura in 1868. He wrote "A Few Recollections of the Early Days of San Buenaventura" in 1942. Died c. 1954 in Ventura.	
19	William McGuire	4/18/1911–4/19/1915		
20	Erwin Kellogg	4/19/1915–4/21/1919		
21	Malvern Dimmick	4/21/1919–4/16/1923	Born 1864 in Onawa, Iowa. Moved to Ventura in 1906, working as a grocer and later as manager of the Ventura Wharf and Warehouse Co. Also served as a justice of the peace 1922–1934. Died 1934 in Ventura.	
22	Charles Rea	4/16/1923–1/30/1928		
23	George Archibald Randall	4/18/1927–6/8/1931	Born in 1887 in Alameda County, California. He was president of the Darden & Randall Buick automobile dealership, an artist and author, and an authority on western ranch life and American Indian subjects. Died 1941 at Foster Memorial Hospital.	
24	W. O. Hedley	6/8/1931–12/21/1931		
?	David J. Reese	1931	Not included on the City's "History of Mayors" list	
25	James S. Blackstock	12/20/1931–1/19/32	Born 1870. Died in 1932 at his home in Ventura after only one month as mayor. Also served as president of chamber of commerce, operated a grocery, and owned lemon ranches	
26	George V. Hartman	1/25/1932–4/24/1933		
27	Frank J. Dennis	4/24/1933–8/26/1936	Born c. 1882.	
28	George A. Newell, Jr.	8/26/1936–4/26/37		
29	Marcus S. Johnson	4/26/37–4/28/1941	Later moved to Turlock, California; died there in 1958.	
30	Harold Young Carrico	4/28/1941–2/13/1945	Born 1893 in Florida, Missouri. He became a prominent builder in Ventura. Died 1952 in Washington County, Utah. Buried at Ivy Lawn Cemetery in Ventura.	
31	Edwin Lee Gardner II	2/13/1945–4/27/1953	Born c. 1895 in Virginia. Worked in the oil business.	
32	Ernest Joel Pate	4/27/1953–9/14/1953	Born 1896; died 1988. Buried at Ivy Lawn.	
33	Charles Wesley Petit	9/14/1953–4/1969	Born 1881 in Ramey, Pennsylvania, died 1973 in Ventura. Served on Ventura City Council from 1948-1969. When he left office, he was the oldest living mayor in the United States	
34	Albert R. Albinger	4/1969–1/1974	He was a 53-year-old realtor when he was selected as mayor in April 1969.	
35	David D. Eaton	1/7/1974–1/5/1976		
36	Eugene Kountz	1/5/1976–1/9/1978	Born 1932. Later filed and lost a wrongful death action against a CHP officer in connection with the shooting death of his son.	
37	Harriet Farrell Kosmo Henson	1/1978–1/1982	Born 1932 in Keene, New Hampshire. Moved to Ventura in 1964, served on City Council from 1976-1984, and became the city's first woman mayor in January 1978. Died in 1999 at Community Memorial Hospital in Ventura.	
38	John Allen McWherter	1/4/1982–1/1984	Born in 1915 in Oklahoma. Served on City Council for 18 years from 1973-1991. He cited 1974 efforts to slow the city's growth as his proudest achievement.	
39	Rolland Dennis Orrock	1984–1986	Attorney born in 1943 in Los Angeles	
40	John M. Sullard	1986–1987	Served on the Ventura City Council, 1982–1987. Later served as city manager of Boulder City, Nevada	
41	James L. Monahan	12/1987–12/1989	A Korean War veteran and graduate of Ventura High School and Ventura College. He has been the owner of American Welding Company and American Hot Tap for 40 years. He served on Ventura City Council from 1977 to present and was selected as mayor in December 1987.	
42	Richard L. Francis	1989–1991	Served on Ventura City Council 1989–1991. A slow growth advocate and co-architect of the Save Open-Space and Agricultural Resources initiative, which prohibits changes to some rural and agricultural land uses without voter approval.	
43	Gregory L. Carson	12/2/1991–12/6/1993	A fifth-generation Ventura resident, he was a 33-year-old nursery owner and lobbyist for the farm industry when he was selected as mayor in December 1991. He survived a shooting by a burglar at his home in October 2015	
44	Tom Buford	12/1993–12/1995	Labor attorney and former president of the Ventura Chamber of Commerce	
45	Clifton "Jack" Tingstrom	12/1995–12/1997	Born in 1935. Served on City Council 1991–1999. Died April 2018	
46	Jim Friedman	12/1997–12/1999		
47	Sandy Smith	12/1999-12/2001	He was a teacher at Buena Vista High School when he was selected as mayor; later worked as a land use consultant for Sespe Consulting	
48	Ray Di Guilio	12/2001–12/2003	Spent 30 years as an administrator with the Ventura County Community College District	
49	Brian Brennan	12/2003–12/2005	Irish-born restaurateur; later appointed to the Ventura Port District Board of Commissioners	
50	Carl E. Morehouse	12/2005–12/2007	Served on City Council for 17 years 1999–2016	
51	Christy Weir	12/2007–12/2009	Elected to City Council in 2003; selected as mayor in December 2007	
52	William Fulton	12/2009–12/2011	Served on City Council, 2003–2011; selected as mayor in December 2009; later served as planning director for the City of San Diego and as director of Rice University's Kinder Institute for Urban Research	
53	Mike Tracy	12/2011–12/2013	Elected to City Council in 2009; selected as mayor in December 2011	
54	Cheryl Heitmann	12/2013–12/2015	Elected to City Council in 2011; selected as mayor in December 2013	
55	Erik Nasarenko	12/2015–12/2017	Elected to City Council in 2013; selected as mayor in December 2015	
56	Neil Andrews	12/2017–12/2018	Elected to City Council in 2001; selected as mayor December 2017	
57	Matt LaVere	12/2018–12/2020	Elected to City Council in 2016; selected as mayor December 2018	
58	Sofia Rubalcava	12/2020–12/2022	Elected to City Council in 2018; selected as mayor December 2020	
59	Joe Schroeder	12/2022–12/2024	Elected to City Council in 2020; selected as mayor December 2022	
60	Dr. Jeanette Sanchez-Palacios	12/2024-Incumbent	Appointed to City Council in 2021; elected for full term in 2022; selected as mayor in December 2024	

== See also ==
- List of mayors of Oxnard, California
- List of mayors of Santa Barbara, California
