= Ventura, California =

- City
- City of San Buenaventura
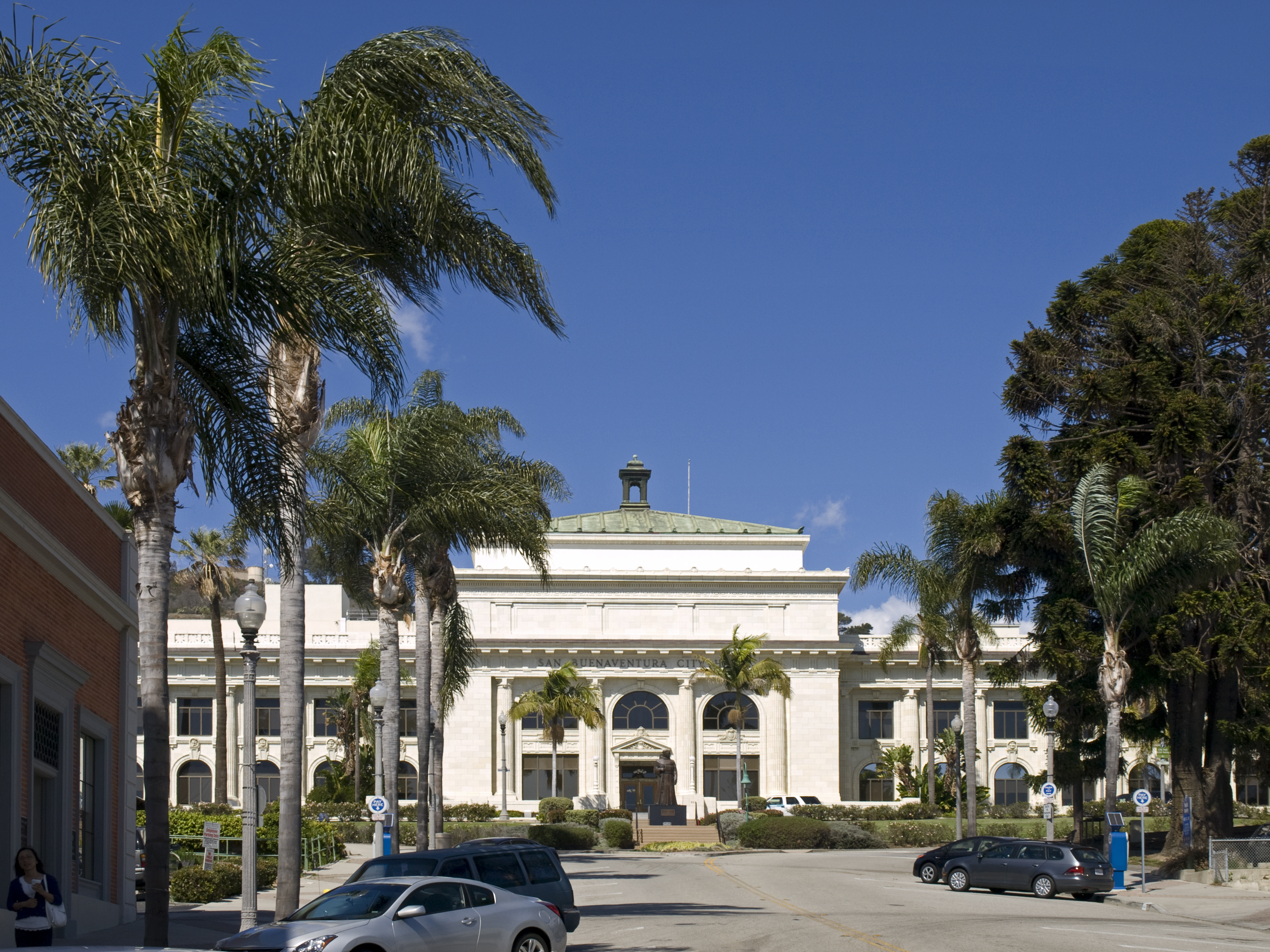
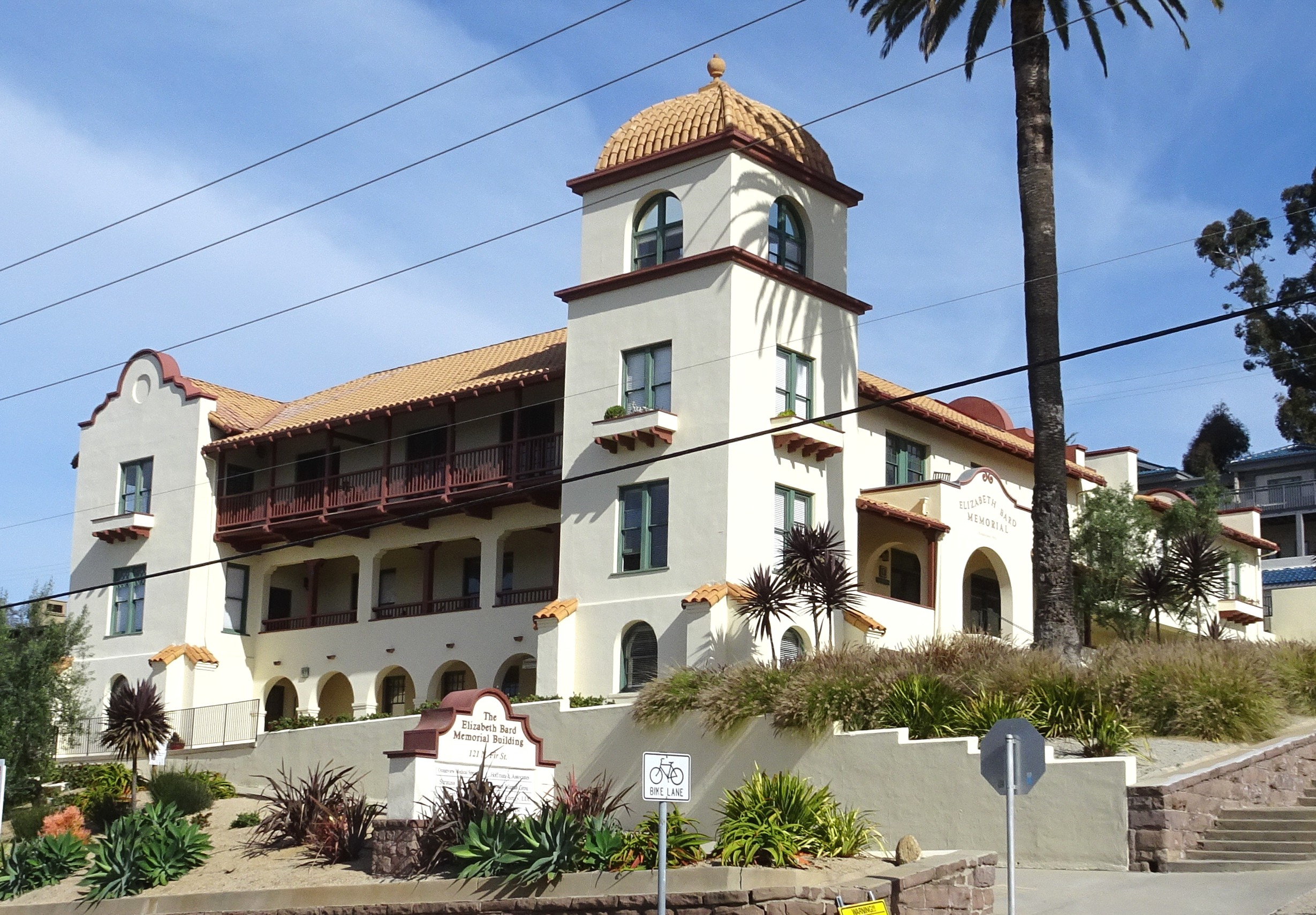
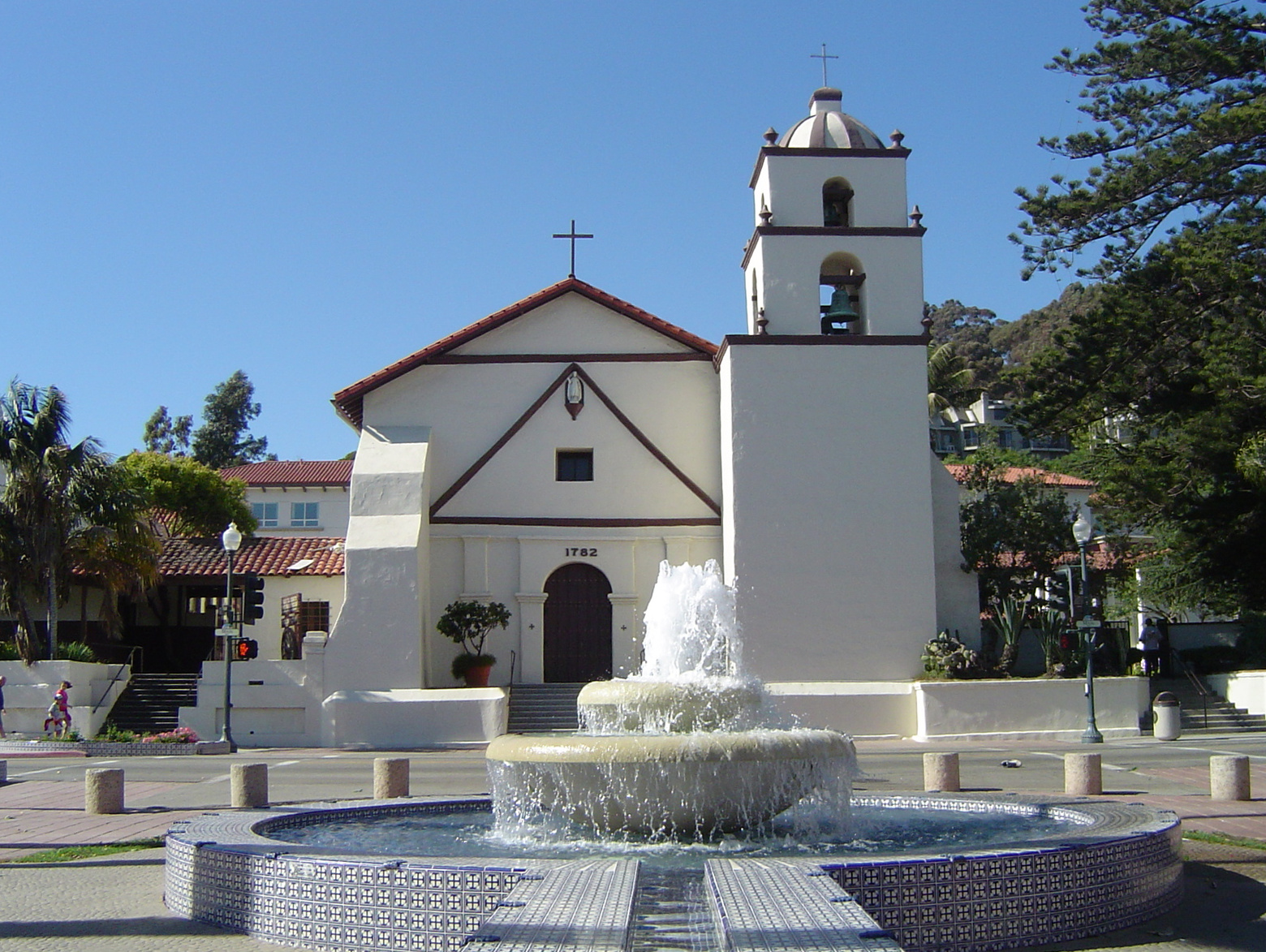
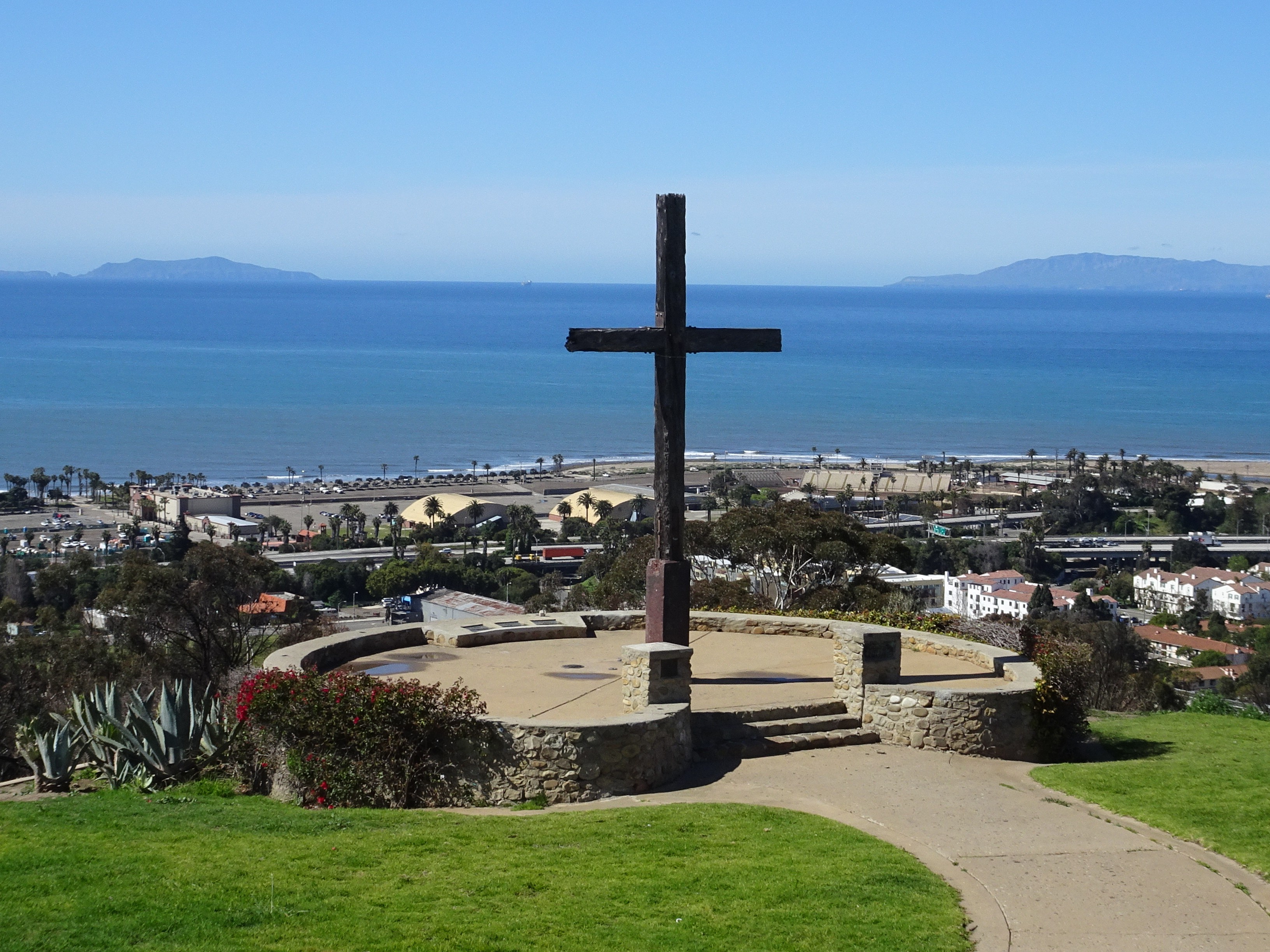
- Ventura Pier on the Central Coast Ventura County Courthouse Elizabeth Bard Memorial Hospital Mission San Buenaventura Serra Cross

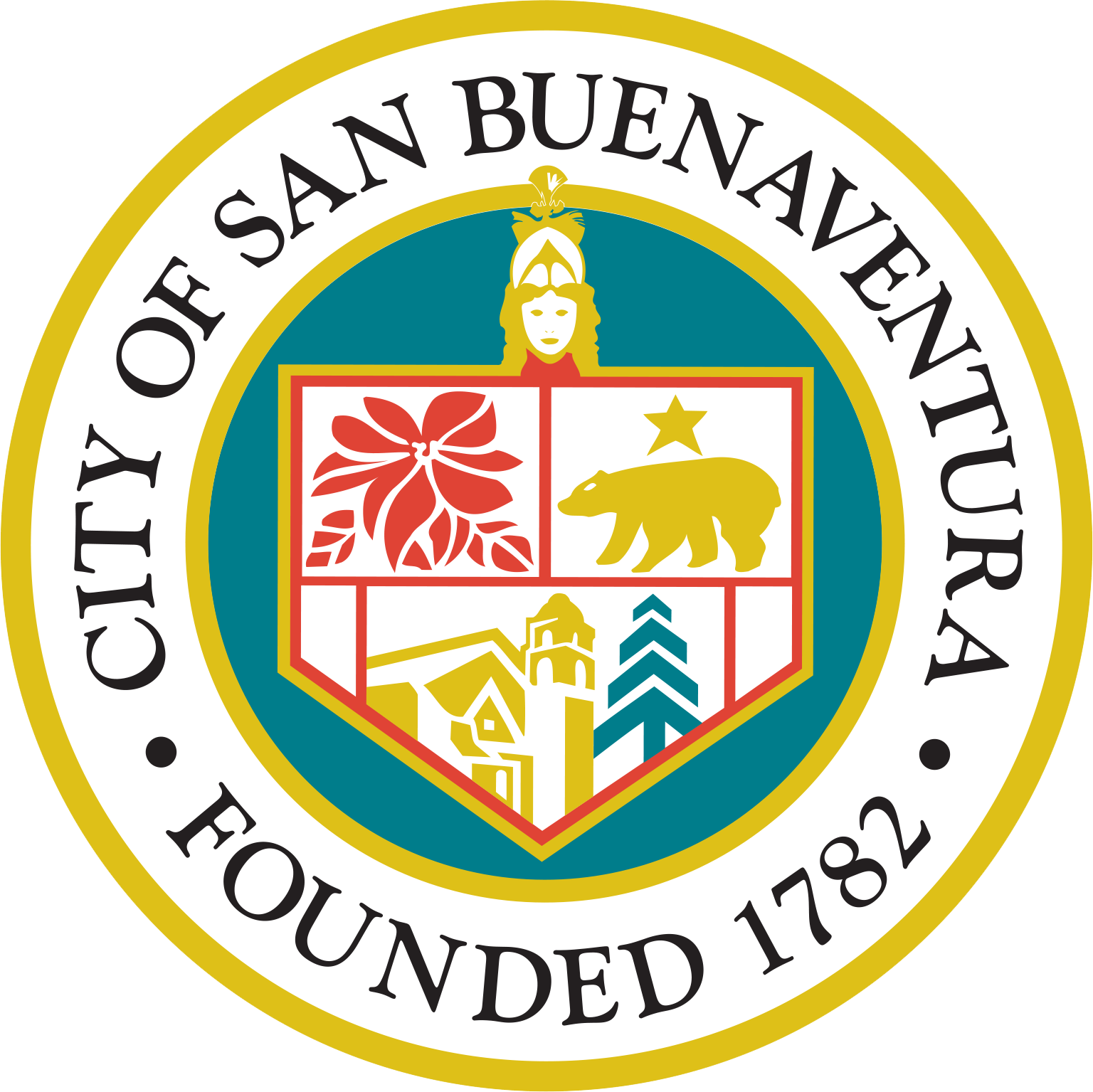
- Seal
- Interactive map of Ventura, California
- Location in Southern California Location in California Location in the United States
- Coordinates: 34°16′30″N 119°13′40″W
- Country: United States
- State: California
- County: Ventura
- Mission San Buenaventura: March 31, 1782
- Municipal corporation: April 2, 1866
- Named for: Saint Bonaventure

Government
  - Mayor: Dr. Jeanette Sanchez-Palacios
  - City manager: Bill Ayub
  - California's 21st State Senate district: Monique Limón (D)
  - California's 38th State Assembly district: Steve Bennett (D)
  - United States House of Representatives: California's 24th congressional district: Salud Carbajal (D); California's 26th congressional district: Julia Brownley (D)

Area
  - Total: 32.29 sq mi (83.63 km^{2})
  - Land: 21.88 sq mi (56.68 km^{2})
  - Water: 10.41 sq mi (26.95 km^{2}) 32.23%
- Elevation: 36 ft (11 m)

Population (2020 United States census)
  - Total: 110,763
  - Rank: 4th in Ventura County; 62nd in California
  - Density: 5,061/sq mi (1,954/km^{2})
- Demonym: Venturan
- Time zone: UTC−8 (Pacific)
  - Summer (DST): UTC−7 (Pacific Daylight Time)
- ZIP codes: 93001–93007, 93009
- Area code: Area code 805
- Federal Information Processing Standards: 06-65042
- Geographic Names Information System feature IDs: 1667934, 2411779
- Website: www.cityofventura.ca.gov

Ventura, officially the City of San Buenaventura (Spanish for "Saint Bonaventure"), is a city in and the county seat of Ventura County, California, United States. It is a coastal city located northwest of Los Angeles. The population was 110,763 at the 2020 United States census. Ventura is a popular tourist destination, owing to its historic landmarks, beaches, and resorts.

Ventura has been inhabited by different peoples, including the Chumash Native Americans, for at least 10,000 years. With the arrival of Spanish missionaries in 1782, Mission San Buenaventura was established by Junípero Serra, giving the city its name. Following the Mexican secularization act of 1833, San Buenaventura was granted by Governor Pío Pico to Don José de Arnaz as Rancho Ex-Mission San Buenaventura and a small community arose. Following the American Conquest of California, San Buenaventura was eventually incorporated as a city in 1866. The 1920s brought a major oil boom which significantly developed and expanded Ventura, a growth that continued with the post–World War II economic expansion.

== History ==
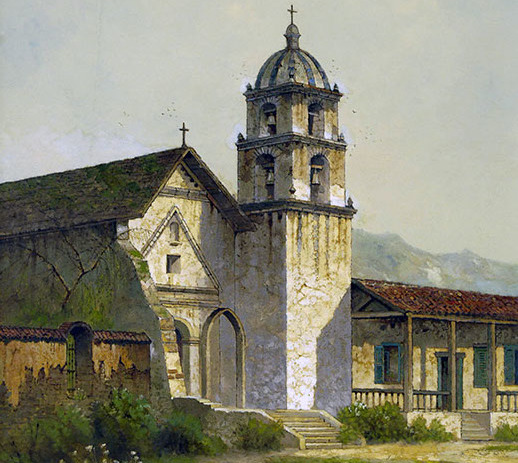
Ventura was founded by the Spanish in 1782, when Saint Junípero Serra established Mission San Buenaventura.

=== Chumash ===
Archaeological discoveries in the area suggest that humans have populated the region for at least 10,000–12,000 years. Archaeological research demonstrates that the Chumash people have deep roots in central and southern coastal regions of California, and has revealed artifacts from their culture. Shisholop Village, designated Historic Point of Interest #18 by the city, was the site of a Chumash village. They had keen oceanic navigational skills made use of the abundant local resources from sea and land. The Ventura Chumash were in contact with the Channel Islands Chumash; both mainland and island Chumash utilized large plank-sewn seagoing canoes, called Tomol, with the island people bringing shell bead money, island chert, and sea otter pelts to trade for mainland products like acorns and deer meat.

=== Spanish era ===
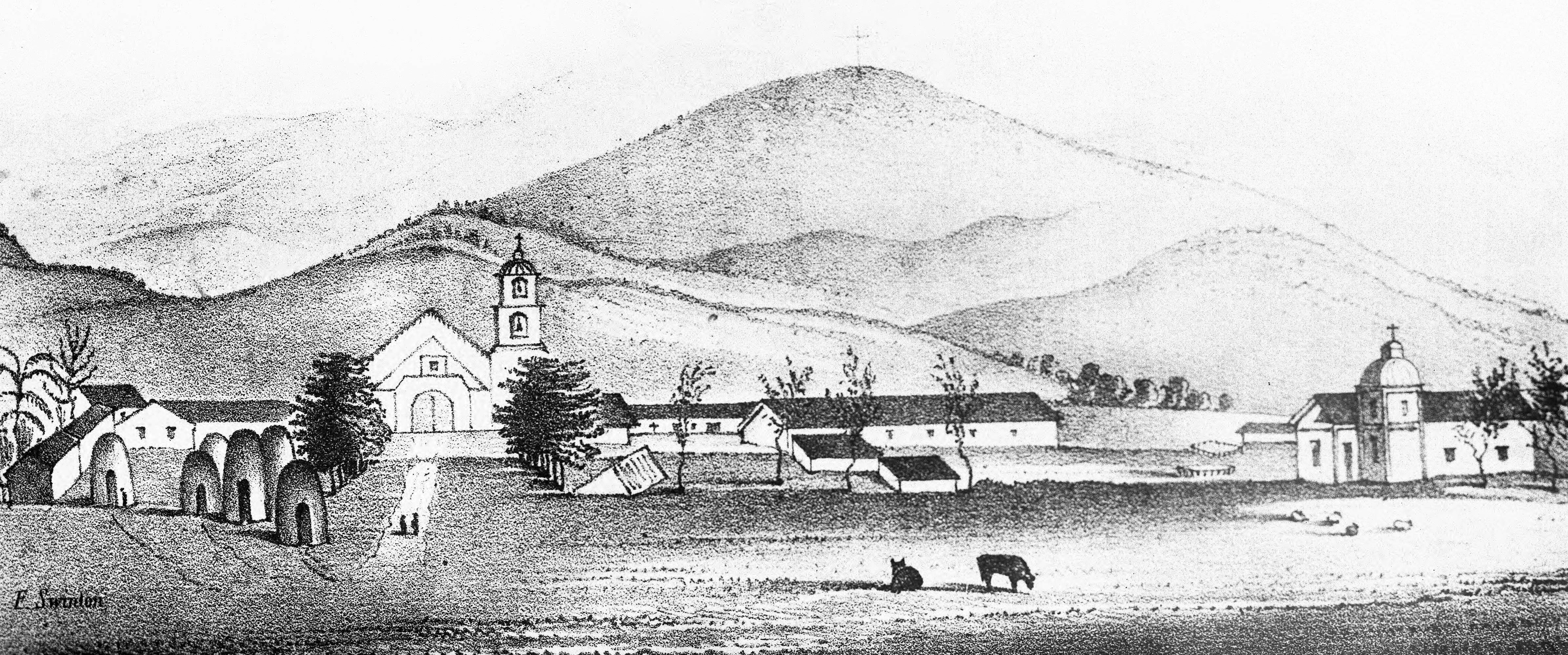
Mission San Buenaventura in 1839

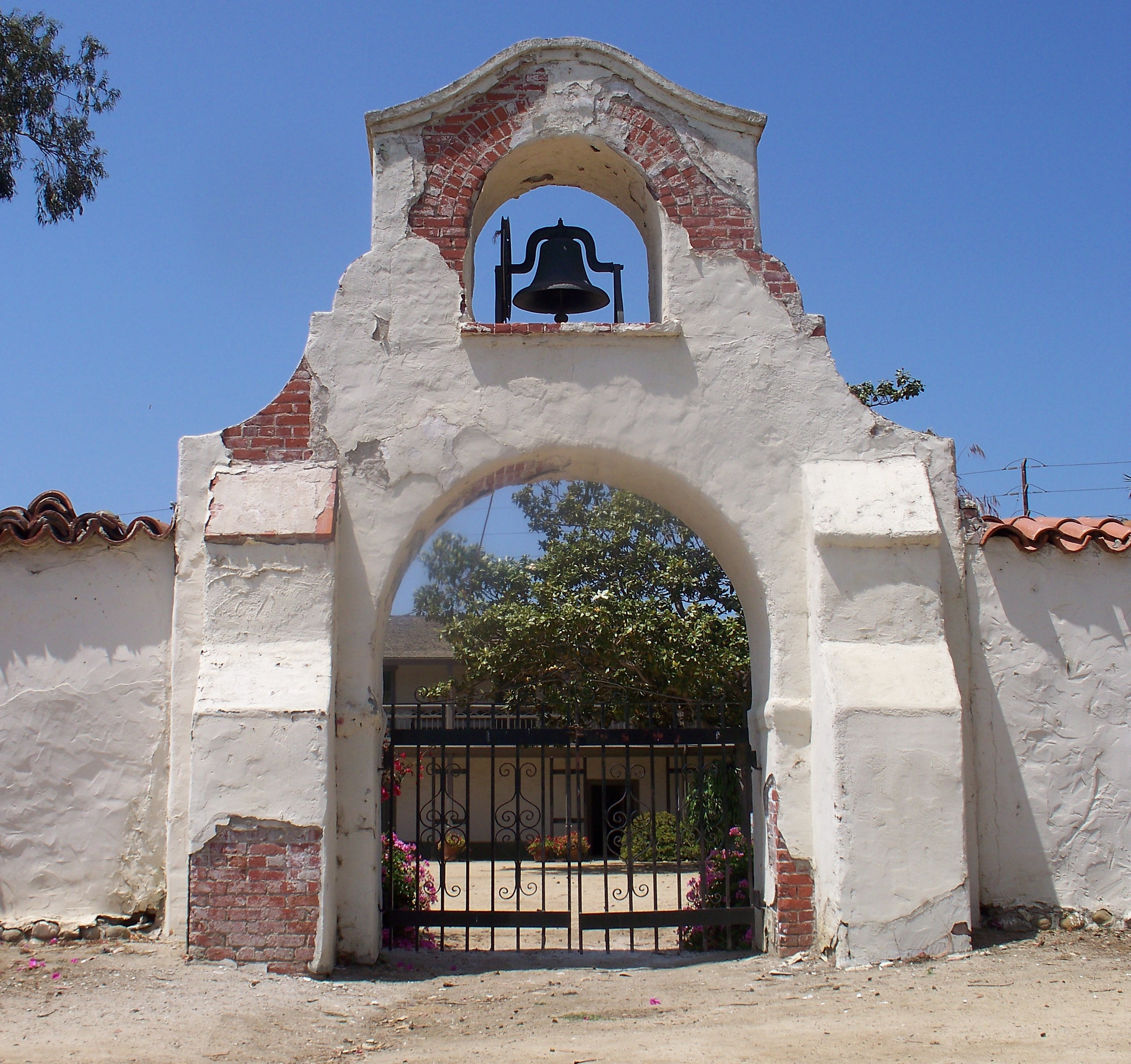
Don Raymundo Olivas, a retired Californio soldier, built the Olivas Adobe in 1841 on his Rancho San Miguel.

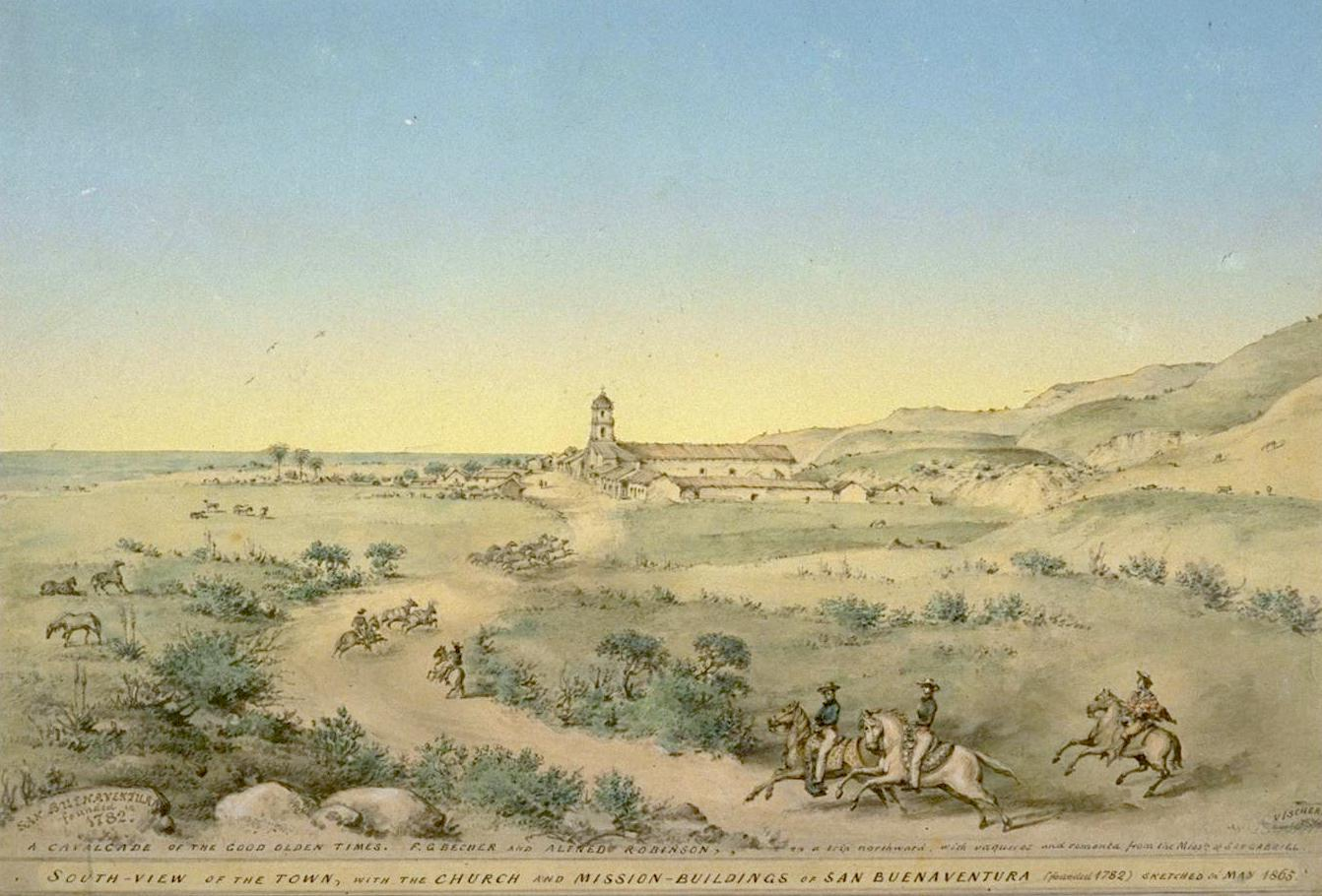
Village of San Buenaventura in 1865

In 1769, the Spanish Portolà expedition, first recorded European visitors to inland areas of California, came down the Santa Clara River Valley from the previous night's encampment near today's Saticoy and camped near the outlet of the Ventura River on August 14. Fray Juan Crespi, a Franciscan missionary traveling with the expedition, noted that "we saw a regular town, the most populous and best laid-out of all that we had seen on the journey up to the present time." Archaeological records found that the Chumash village they encountered was settled sometime around AD 1000. Junípero Serra, first leader of the Franciscans in California, founded Mission San Buenaventura in 1782 as his ninth and last mission established near the Chumash village as part of Spain's colonization of Alta California. The mission was named for St. Bonaventure, a 13th-century Franciscan saint and a Doctor of the Church. San Miguel Chapel was the first outpost and center of operations while the first Mission San Buenaventura was being constructed. The first mission burned in 1801 and a replacement building of brick and stone was completed in 1809. The bell tower and facade of the new mission was destroyed by an 1812 earthquake. The Mission was rebuilt and functions as a parish church.

=== Mexican era ===
The Mexican secularization act of 1833 was passed twelve years after Mexico won independence from Spain in 1821. Mission land was sold or given away in large grants called ranchos. Rancho Ex-Mission San Buenaventura was a 48,823-acre (197.58 km^{2}) grant that included downtown Ventura. The Battle of San Buenaventura was fought in 1838 between competing armies from northern and southern California. Governor Juan Bautista Alvarado granted Rancho San Miguel to Felipe Lorenzana and Raymundo Olivas, whose Olivas Adobe on the banks of the Santa Clara River was the most magnificent hacienda south of Monterey. Fernando Tico also received a Mexican land grant for Ojai and a parcel near the river in downtown Ventura.

=== American era ===
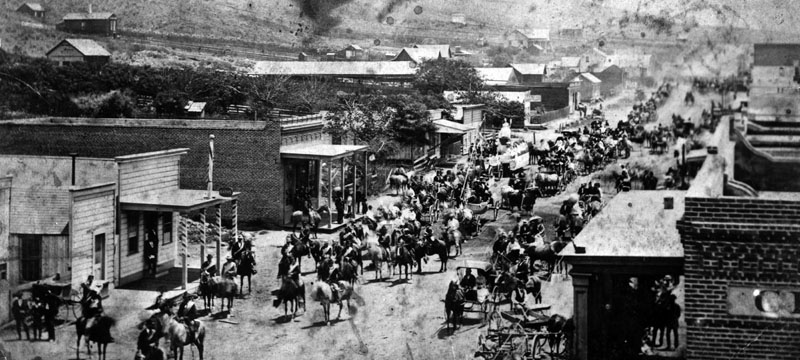
Fourth of July celebration in 1874. The Parade Marshal is Thomas R. Bard.

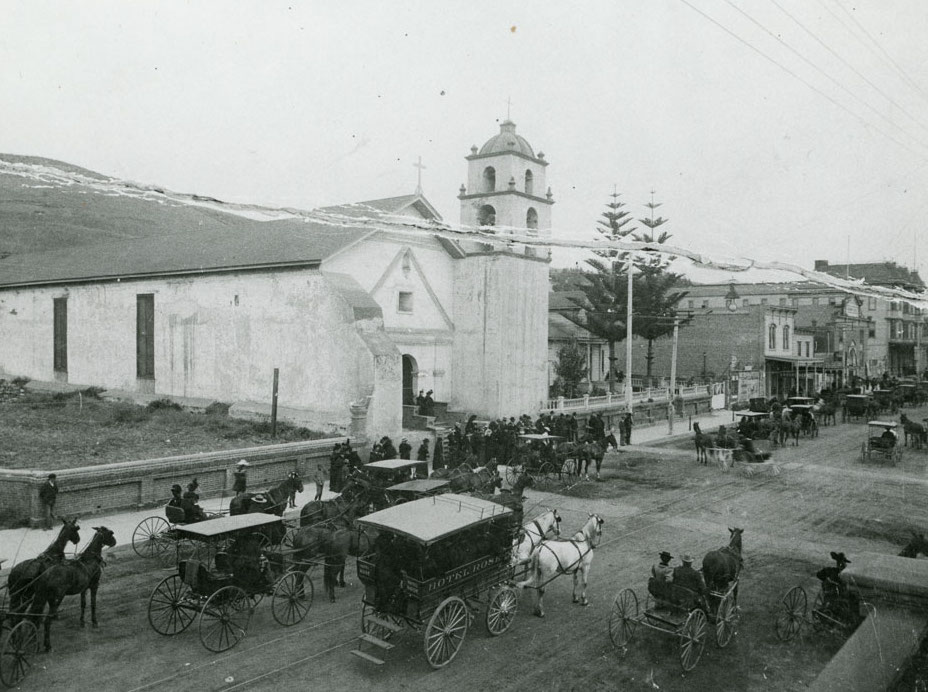
Downtown Ventura in 1898

Following the American Conquest of California in the Mexican–American War, California became a U.S. territory in 1848 and a U.S. state in 1850. After the American Civil War, settlers came to the area, buying land from the Mexicans, or simply as squatters. Vast holdings were later acquired by Easterners, including railroad magnate Thomas A. Scott. He sent Thomas R. Bard to handle Scott's property.

Ventura had a flourishing Chinese settlement in the early 1880s. The largest concentration of activity, known as China Alley, was just across Main Street from the Mission San Buenaventura.

Ventura Pier was built in 1872 at a cost of $45,000 and was the longest wooden pier in California. By 1917, it had been rebuilt to a length of 1,700 feet (520 m). Much of the pier was destroyed by a storm in 1995, but it was subsequently rebuilt.

In 1913, the Rincon Sea Level Road and the Ventura River Bridge opened.

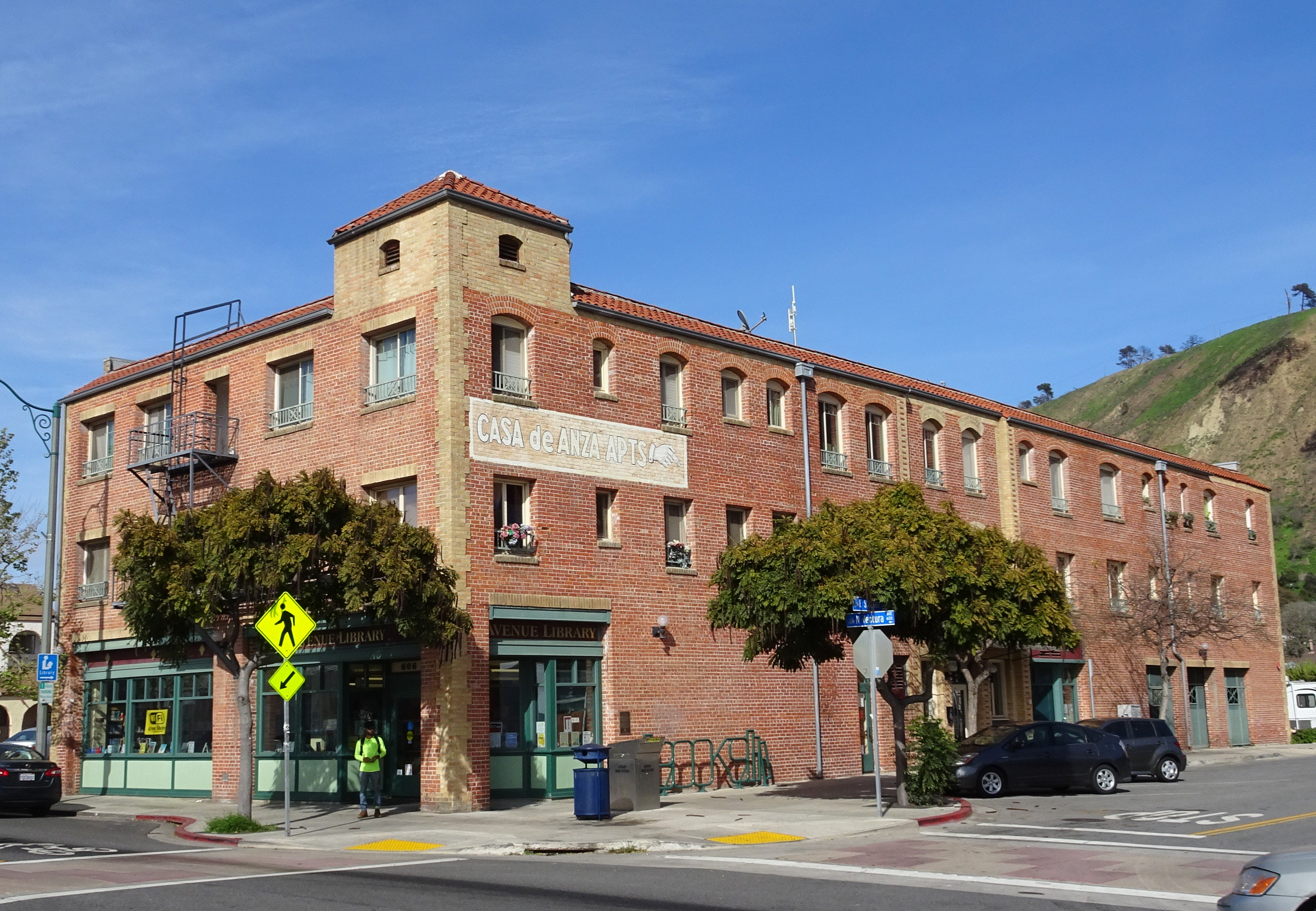
Casa de Anza, built in 1929 to house workers from the Ventura Oil Field

The large Ventura Oil Field was first drilled in 1919 and at its peak produced 90,000 barrels per day (14,000 m^{3}/d). The development of the oil fields in the 1920s, along with the building of better roads to Los Angeles and the affordability of automobiles, enabled a major real estate boom. Symphony concerts and Little League teams were sponsored by the oil companies. Contemporary downtown Ventura is defined by extant buildings from this period. Landmarks built during the oil boom include Ventura Theatre (1928), the First Baptist Church of Ventura (1926), the Ventura Hotel (1926), and the Mission Theatre (1928).

On March 12, 1928, the St. Francis Dam, 54 miles (87 km) inland, failed catastrophically, creating a flood that took more than 600 lives as it flowed down the Santa Clara River to the ocean.

From the south, travel by auto was slow and hazardous, until the completion of a four-lane freeway (US Highway 101) over the Conejo Grade in 1959. This route, which was widened and improved by 1969, is known as the Ventura Freeway, which directly links Ventura with the rest of the Greater Los Angeles.

In 2017, the Thomas Fire started north of Ventura in Santa Paula. Propelled by the Santa Ana Winds, the fire spread into hillside neighborhoods of Ventura and the area above downtown. The fire burned down 504 residences burned in the city.

Main Street in the downtown was closed to vehicle traffic in June 2020 in an effort to boost business and keep people safe during the COVID-19 pandemic. In January 2025, the Ventura City Council voted to keep Main Street closed and proceed with its designation of a formal pedestrian mall.

== Geography ==
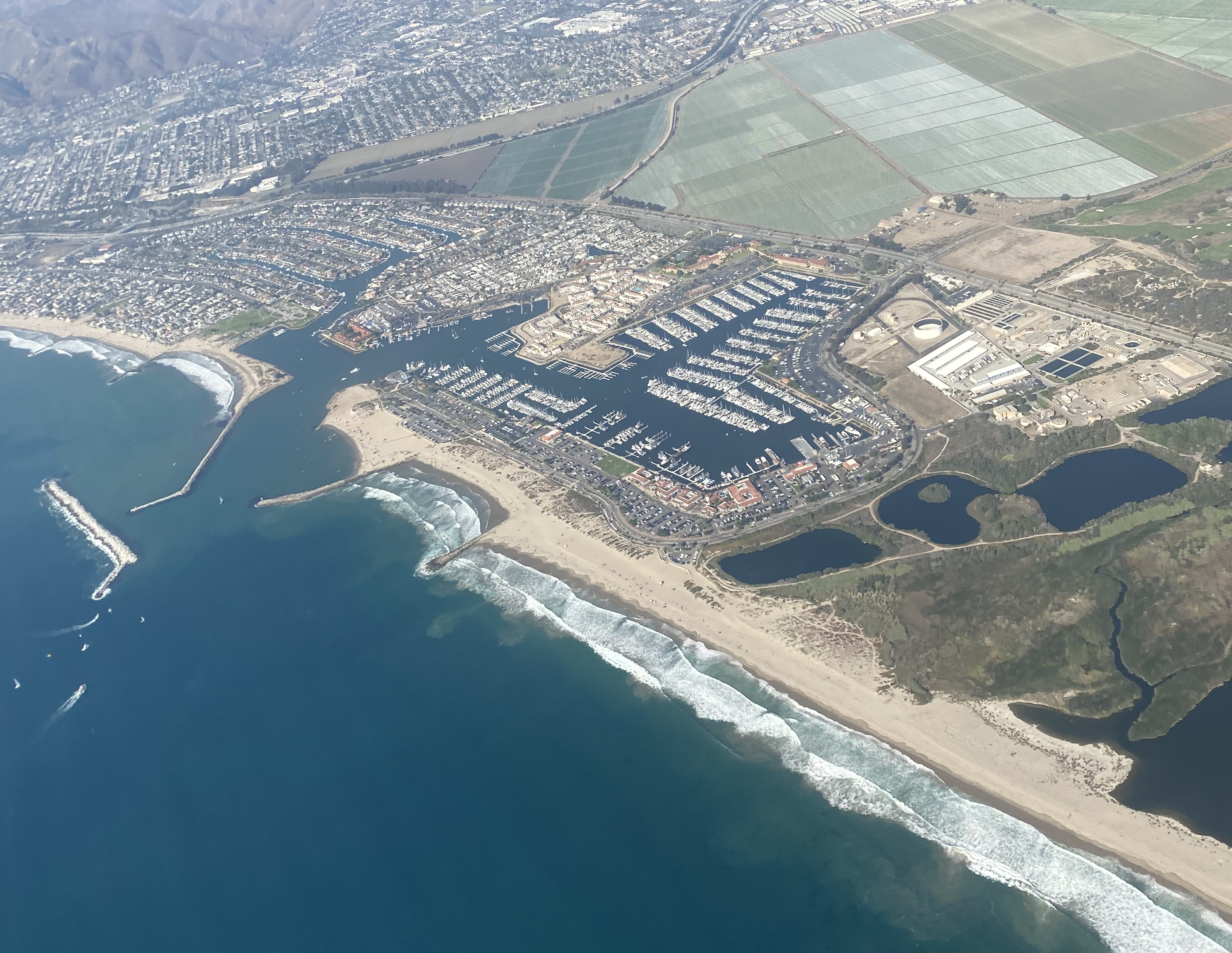
View of Ventura Harbor

Aerial view of Ventura

Ventura is located northwest of Los Angeles on the California coast. The western portion of the city stretches north along the Ventura River which is characterized by a narrow valley with steeply sloped areas along both sides. The steep slopes of the Ventura foothills abut the northern portion of the community. Much of the eastern portion is on a relatively flat alluvial coastal plain lying along the western edge of the Oxnard Plain. Several Barrancas extend from the foothills to the Santa Clara River which forms the city's southerly boundary. The city extends up to the beginning of the Santa Clara River Valley at the historic community of Saticoy.

Ventura is within a seismically active region like much of California and is crossed by several potentially active fault systems. The Ventura Fault is capable of an 8.0 earthquake and a local tsunami up to 7 metres (23 feet) in height. According to the United States Census Bureau, Ventura has a total area of 32.3 square miles (84 km^{2}), of which 21.9 square miles (57 km^{2}) is land and 10.4 square miles (27 km^{2}), comprising 32.23%, is water.

=== Climate ===
Ventura, California

Climate chart (precipitation, max. and min. temperature)
J	F	M	A	M	J	J	A	S	O	N	D
3.6 67 44	3.8 67 45	2.8 67 47	0.9 69 48	0.3 71 52	0.1 73 56	0.1 76 59	0.1 77 58	0.1 77 57	0.7 75 53	1.1 71 47	2.6 67 44
- █ Average max. and min. temperatures in °F
- █ Precipitation totals in inches
Metric conversion
J	F	M	A	M	J	J	A	S	O	N	D
91 19 7	97 19 7	71 19 8	23 21 9	7.6 22 11	2.5 23 13	2.5 24 15	2.5 25 14	2.5 25 14	18 24 12	28 22 8	66 19 7
- █ Average max. and min. temperatures in °C
- █ Precipitation totals in mm

Ventura has a Mediterranean climate, typical of most coastal California cities, with the sea breeze off the Pacific Ocean moderating temperatures. It is not uncommon for the city to be affected by Santa Ana winds off the Transverse Ranges on occasion, which increase temperatures dramatically.

Climate data for Ventura, California
Month	Jan	Feb	Mar	Apr	May	Jun	Jul	Aug	Sep	Oct	Nov	Dec	Year
Record high °F (°C)	90 (32)	89 (32)	99 (37)	100 (38)	101 (38)	101 (38)	103 (39)	101 (38)	105 (41)	105 (41)	98 (37)	89 (32)	105 (41)
Mean daily maximum °F (°C)	66.5 (19.2)	66.6 (19.2)	67.4 (19.7)	69.3 (20.7)	70.9 (21.6)	72.7 (22.6)	76.0 (24.4)	77.0 (25.0)	76.7 (24.8)	74.5 (23.6)	70.7 (21.5)	66.7 (19.3)	71.3 (21.8)
Mean daily minimum °F (°C)	44.0 (6.7)	45.0 (7.2)	46.7 (8.2)	48.1 (8.9)	52.1 (11.2)	55.6 (13.1)	58.7 (14.8)	58.4 (14.7)	57.0 (13.9)	52.8 (11.6)	47.4 (8.6)	43.6 (6.4)	50.8 (10.4)
Record low °F (°C)	28 (−2)	27 (−3)	33 (1)	34 (1)	35 (2)	39 (4)	41 (5)	46 (8)	41 (5)	33 (1)	31 (−1)	27 (−3)	27 (−3)
Average rainfall inches (mm)	3.59 (91)	3.81 (97)	2.81 (71)	0.92 (23)	0.27 (6.9)	0.04 (1.0)	0.09 (2.3)	0.01 (0.25)	0.07 (1.8)	0.73 (19)	1.09 (28)	2.63 (67)	16.06 (408)
Source 1:
Source 2:

== Demographics ==
Historical population
Census	Pop.	Note	%±
1880	1,370		—
1890	2,320		69.3%
1900	2,470		6.5%
1910	2,901		17.4%
1920	4,156		43.3%
1930	11,603		179.2%
1940	13,264		14.3%
1950	16,534		24.7%
1960	29,114		76.1%
1970	57,964		99.1%
1980	73,774		27.3%
1990	92,575		25.5%
2000	100,916		9.0%
2010	106,433		5.5%
2020	110,763		4.1%
U.S. Decennial Census

The community is registered in the census as San Buenaventura (Ventura).

Founded in 1782, the Mission Basilica of San Buenaventura is a parish of the Roman Catholic Archdiocese of Los Angeles. In 2020, Pope Francis elevated it to the category of basilica.

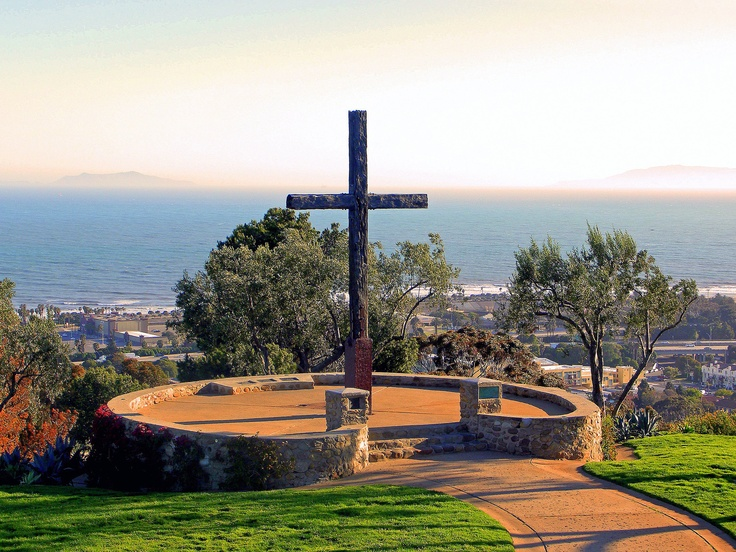
The Serra Cross was first erected on top of Loma de la Cruz in 1782.

Ventura city, California – Racial and ethnic composition Note: the US Census treats Hispanic/Latino as an ethnic category. This table excludes Latinos from the racial categories and assigns them to a separate category. Hispanics/Latinos may be of any race.
Race / Ethnicity (NH = Non-Hispanic)	Pop 2000	Pop 2010	Pop 2020	% 2000	% 2010	% 2020
White alone (NH)	68,710	63,879	59,425	68.09%	60.02%	53.65%
Black or African American alone (NH)	1,284	1,466	1,743	1.27%	1.38%	1.57%
Native American or Alaska Native alone (NH)	631	545	399	0.63%	0.51%	0.36%
Asian alone (NH)	2,933	3,523	4,267	2.91%	3.31%	3.85%
Pacific Islander alone (NH)	134	167	163	0.13%	0.16%	0.15%
Other Race alone (NH)	152	181	661	0.15%	0.17%	0.60%
Mixed race or Multiracial (NH)	2,499	2,798	5,203	2.48%	2.63%	4.70%
Hispanic or Latino (any race)	24,573	33,874	38,902	24.35%	31.83%	35.12%
Total	100,916	106,433	110,763	100.00%	100.00%	100.00%

=== 2020 ===
The 2020 United States census reported that Ventura had a population of 110,763. The population density was 5,061.1 inhabitants per square mile (1,954.1/km^{2}). The racial makeup of Ventura was 61.5% White, 1.8% African American, 1.5% Native American, 4.0% Asian, 0.2% Pacific Islander, 14.2% from other races, and 16.8% from two or more races. Hispanic or Latino of any race were 35.1% of the population.

The census reported that 97.5% of the population lived in households, 1.7% lived in non-institutionalized group quarters, and 0.8% were institutionalized.

There were 42,214 households, out of which 28.9% included children under the age of 18, 46.3% were married-couple households, 7.9% were cohabiting couple households, 28.2% had a female householder with no partner present, and 17.6% had a male householder with no partner present. 26.5% of households were one person, and 12.5% were one person aged 65 or older. The average household size was 2.56. There were 27,462 families (65.1% of all households).

The age distribution was 20.1% under the age of 18, 7.7% aged 18 to 24, 26.6% aged 25 to 44, 26.9% aged 45 to 64, and 18.7% who were 65 years of age or older. The median age was 41.4 years. For every 100 females, there were 94.4 males.

There were 44,612 housing units at an average density of 2,038.5 units per square mile (787.1 units/km^{2}), of which 42,214 (94.6%) were occupied. Of these, 55.3% were owner-occupied, and 44.7% were occupied by renters.

In 2023, the US Census Bureau estimated that the median household income was $100,407, and the per capita income was $49,411. About 6.4% of families and 10.4% of the population were below the poverty line.

=== 2010 ===
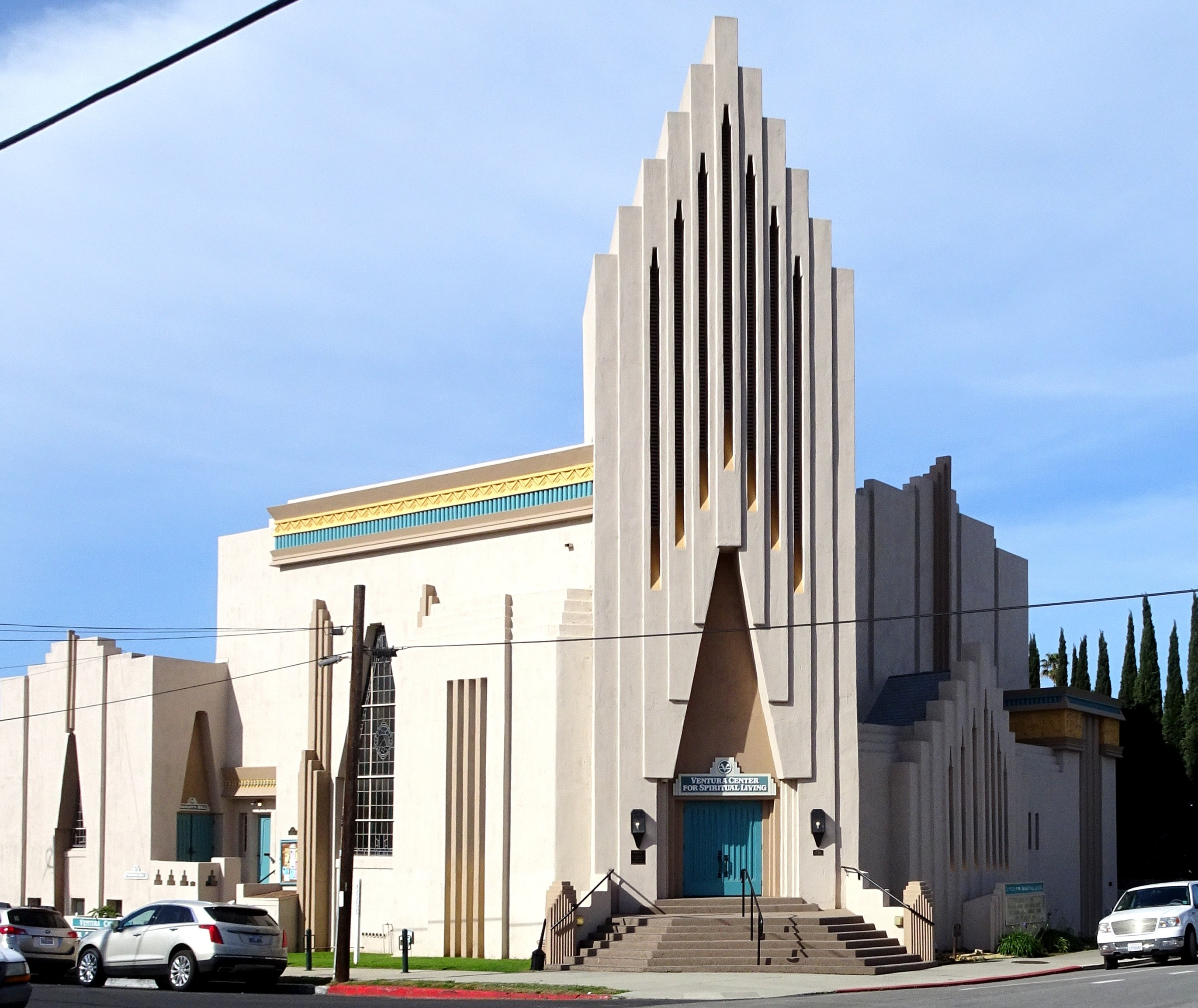
The Mayan Revival style First Baptist Church of Ventura, built between 1926 and 1932

The 2010 United States census reported that Ventura had a population of 106,433. The population density was 3,316.2 inhabitants per square mile (1,280.4/km^{2}). The racial makeup of Ventura was 76.6% White, 1.6% African American, 1.2% Native American, 3.4% Asian (0.9% Filipino, 0.6% Chinese, 0.4% Indian, 0.4% Korean, 0.4% Japanese, 0.3% Vietnamese, 0.5% Other), 0.2% Pacific Islander, 5.2% from two or more races. Hispanic or Latino people of any race were 31.8% of the population.

The Census reported that 103,940 people (97.7% of the population) lived in households, 755 (0.7%) lived in non-institutionalized group quarters, and 1,738 (1.6%) were institutionalized.

There were 40,438 households, out of which 13,014 (32.2%) had children under the age of 18 living in them, 18,907 (46.8%) were opposite-sex married couples living together, 4,936 (12.2%) had a female householder with no husband present, 2,153 (5.3%) had a male householder with no wife present. There were 2,621 (6.5%) unmarried opposite-sex partnerships, and 371 (0.9%) same-sex married couples or partnerships. 10,959 households (27.1%) were made up of individuals, and 4,271 (10.6%) had someone living alone who was 65 years of age or older. The average household size was 2.57. There were 25,996 families (64.3% of all households); the average family size was 3.14.

The population was spread out, with 23,918 people (22.5%) under the age of 18, 9,581 people (9.0%) aged 18 to 24, 28,814 people (27.1%) aged 25 to 44, 29,957 people (28.1%) aged 45 to 64, and 14,163 people (13.3%) who were 65 years of age or older. The median age was 39.0 years. For every 100 females, there were 97.7 males. For every 100 females age 18 and over, there were 95.6 males.

There were 42,827 housing units at an average density of 1,334.4 per square mile (515.2/km^{2}), of which 22,600 (55.9%) were owner-occupied, and 17,838 (44.1%) were occupied by renters. The homeowner vacancy rate was 1.3%; the rental vacancy rate was 5.5%. 59,330 people (55.7% of the population) lived in owner-occupied housing units and 44,610 people (41.9%) lived in rental housing units.

== Economy ==
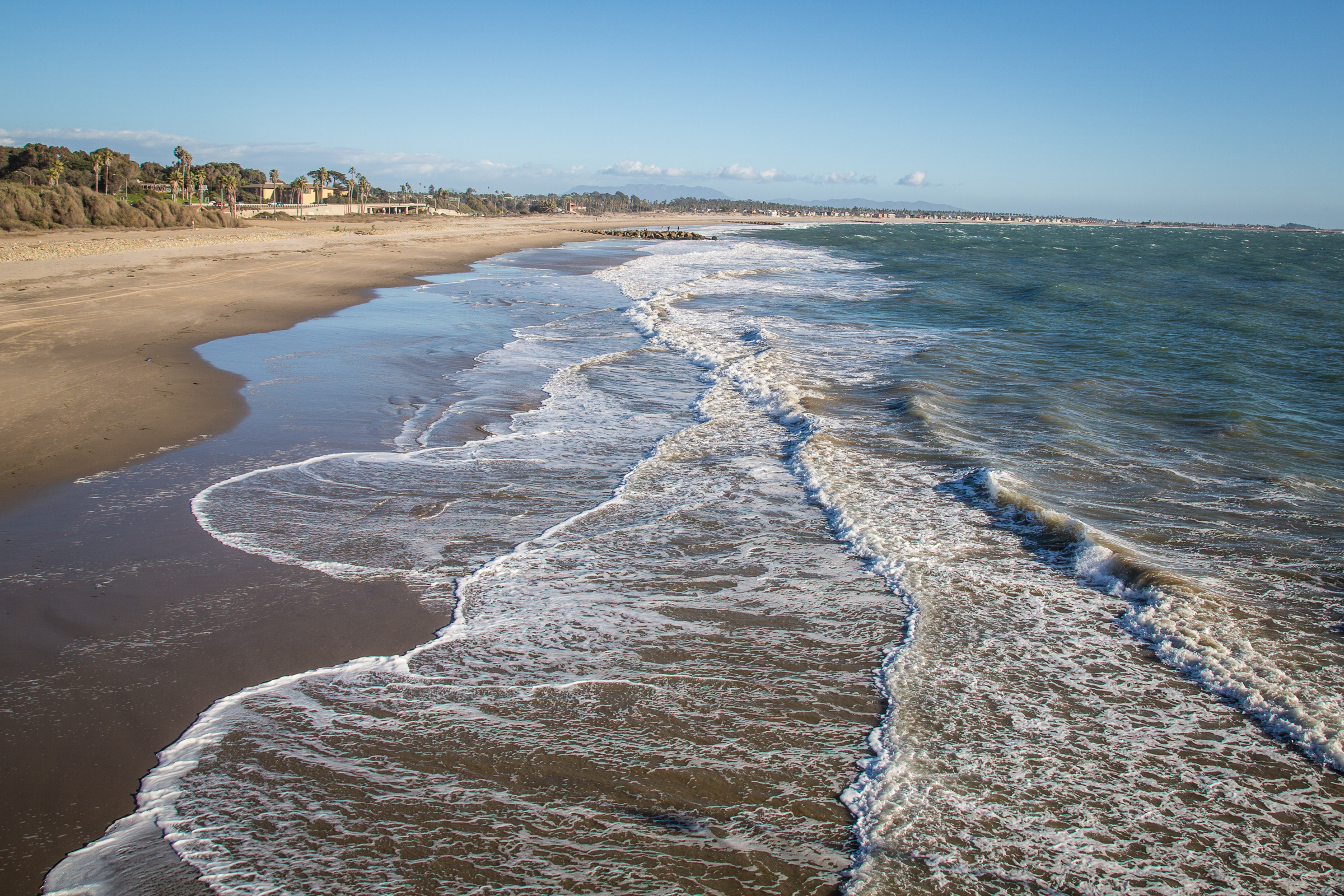
San Buenaventura State Beach is a tourist destination.

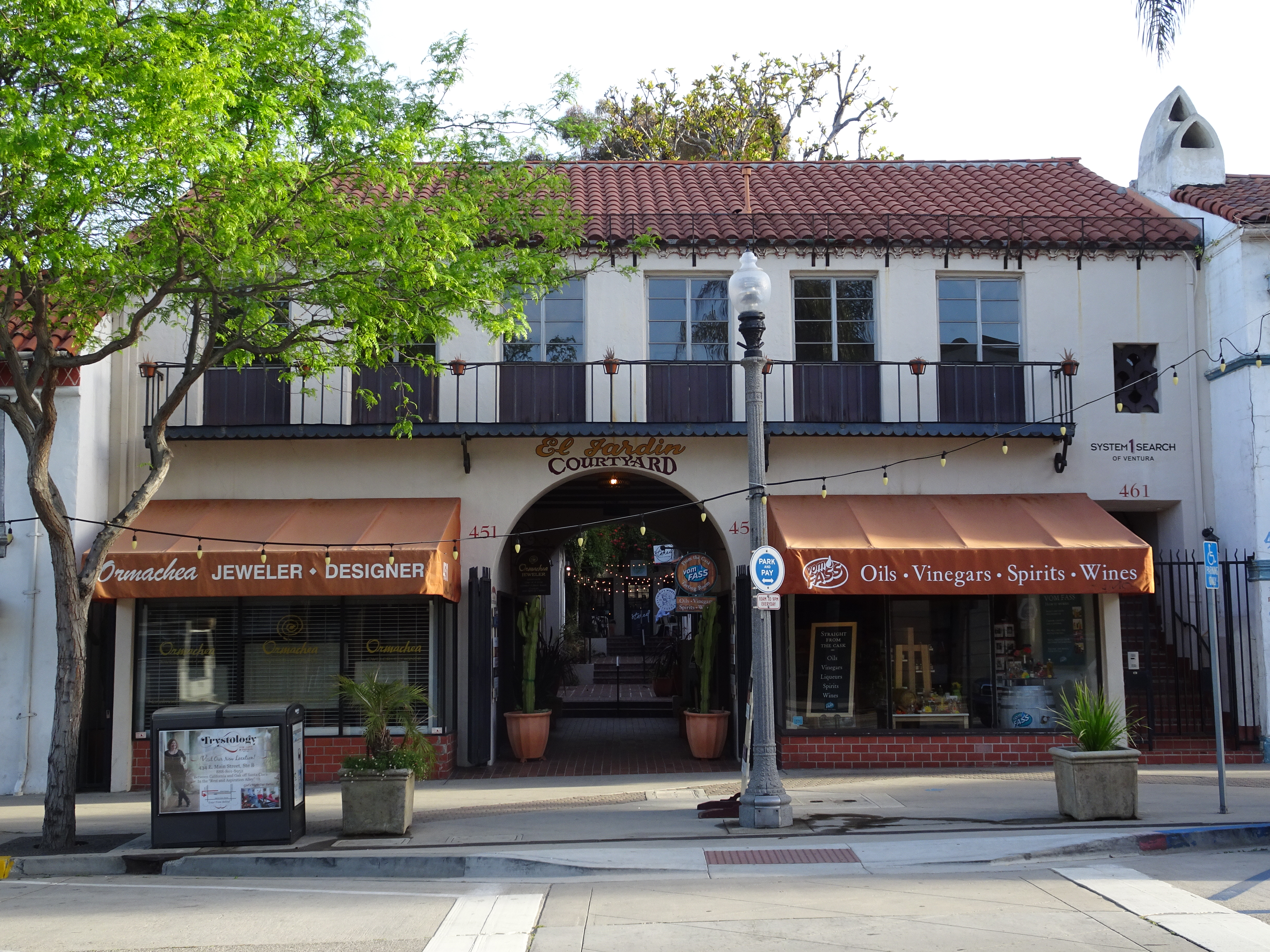
Shops in Downtown Ventura

Ventura is a popular tourist destination in Southern California, owing to its historic landmarks, beaches, and the local leisure economy. Businesses related to tourism and hospitality account for a significant portion of Ventura's economic activity.

The outdoor clothing manufacturer Patagonia is based in Ventura. Diaper bag manufacturer Petunia Pickle Bottom was founded in Ventura. Research and resource company The Barna Group is located near downtown Ventura.

In 2009 the City of Ventura created Ventura Ventures Technology Center, a business incubator with a high-tech focus. Ventura Ventures Technology Center was created as an economic engine to develop jobs and companies locally, as well as attract entrepreneurs to the area. The Trade Desk was started in the incubator. The Trade Desk, an industry leader in advertising on streaming services, is the second biggest publicly-traded company in Ventura County by market capitalization.

=== Top employers ===
The historic Ventura Pier

According to the city's 2020 Comprehensive Annual Financial Report, the top employers in the city are:

#	Employer	Number of employees	% of total city employment
1	County of Ventura	8,232	15.08%
2	Ventura Unified School District	2,650	4.85%
3	Community Memorial Health System	2,176	3.99%
4	Employer's Depot Inc.	820	1.50%
5	Patagonia Works (Lost Arrow Corp.)	665	1.22%
6	Kaiser Permanente	656	1.20%
7	Ventura County Community College District	653	1.20%
8	City of San Buenaventura	615	1.13%
9	Target	495	0.91%
10	Ventura Superior Court	305	0.56%

=== Cannabis ===
Following the legalization of cannabis in California, local governments can prohibit companies from growing, testing, and selling cannabis within their jurisdiction by licensing none or only some of these activities but may not prohibit adults from growing, using or transporting marijuana for personal use. The state allows deliveries without local agency licensing at the point of delivery. In November 2020, a ballot measure for taxation of cannabis was approved by city voters. The City Council adopted a resolution allowing a maximum number of cannabis businesses in the city in February 2021. The ordinances allow up to three retail permits and up to 10 distribution permits. In October 2022, the City Manager selected four businesses to be allowed to operate in the city after a lengthy application and ranking process. Three retail and one distribution business without a retail component were selected. Two more permits for the city's coastal zone, which includes downtown were considered and rejected after further information requested from the California Coastal Commission was reviewed. Once the appeals process is completed, applicants worked with the city on safety, security, odor control and other issues before being able to open for business. In late June 2023, the three retail businesses that were selected filed a lawsuit against the city for a court order that would end the appeals and force the city to issue them permits. The other five finalists had appealed, resulting in a lengthy delay while the appeal was sent to the California Office of Administrative Hearings. The city decided in late July to issue permits to the three businesses already selected immediately after August 31 and also issue permits to three of the other five finalists.

== Arts and culture ==
=== Music venues ===
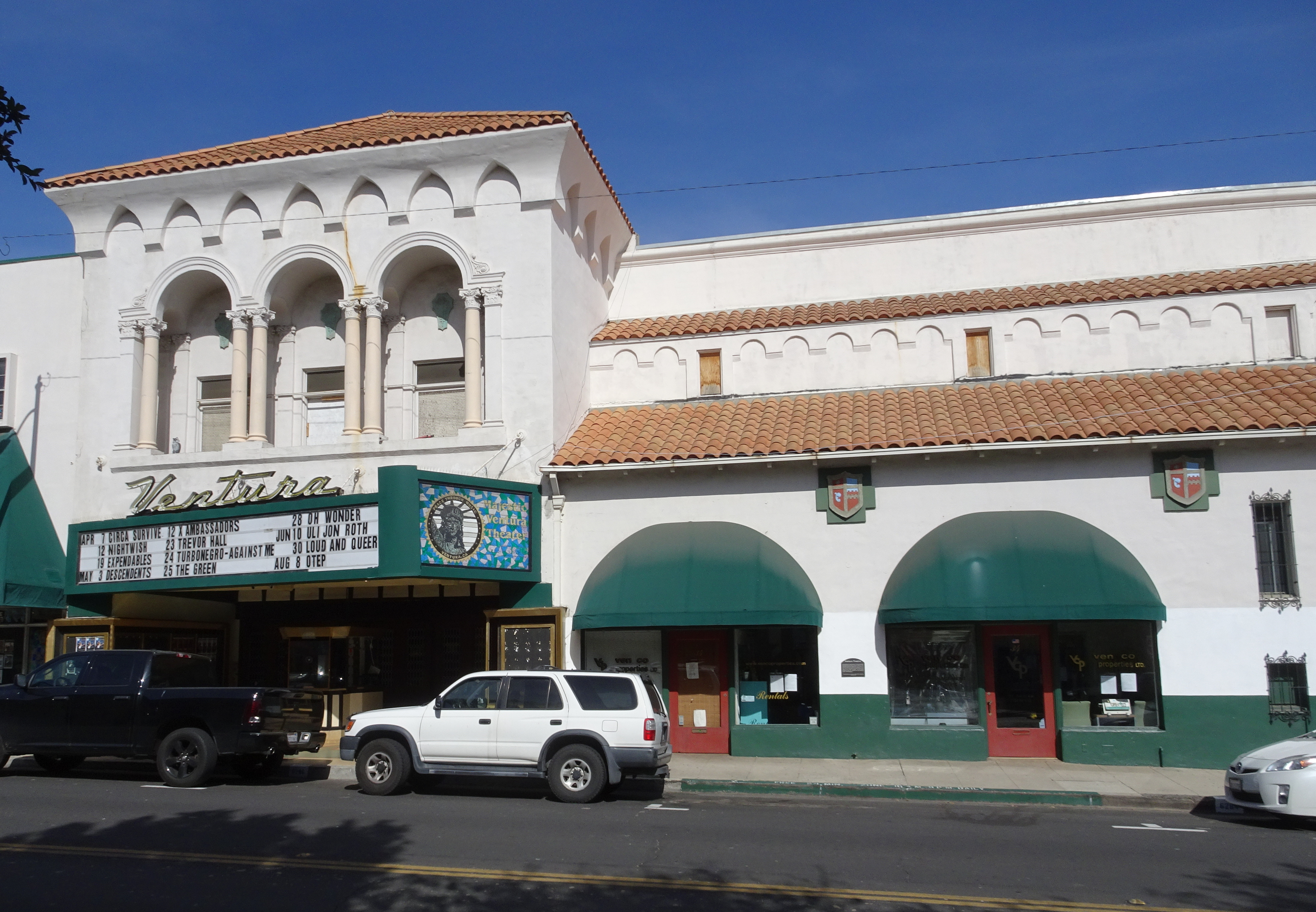
The historic Ventura Theatre was built as a movie palace in 1928.

The Majestic Ventura Theater is an early-20th-century landmark in the downtown. It has been a venue for concerts such as The Doors, Pearl Jam, Van Halen, X, Ray Charles, Red Hot Chili Peppers, Social Distortion, Bad Religion, Fugazi, Incubus, Tom Petty, They Might Be Giants, and Johnny Cash, as well as homegrown artists like KYLE, Cirith Ungol, Big Bad Voodoo Daddy and Army of Freshmen.

The Ventura County Fairgrounds is the home of the annual Ventura County Fair, and over the years has hosted such acts as Jimi Hendrix, The Grateful Dead, Phish, Smokey Robinson, All American Rejects, Smash Mouth, and Sugar Ray, as well as the Vans Warped Tour. The train station for Amtrak's Pacific Surfliner route is adjacent to the fairgrounds.

=== Downtown ===
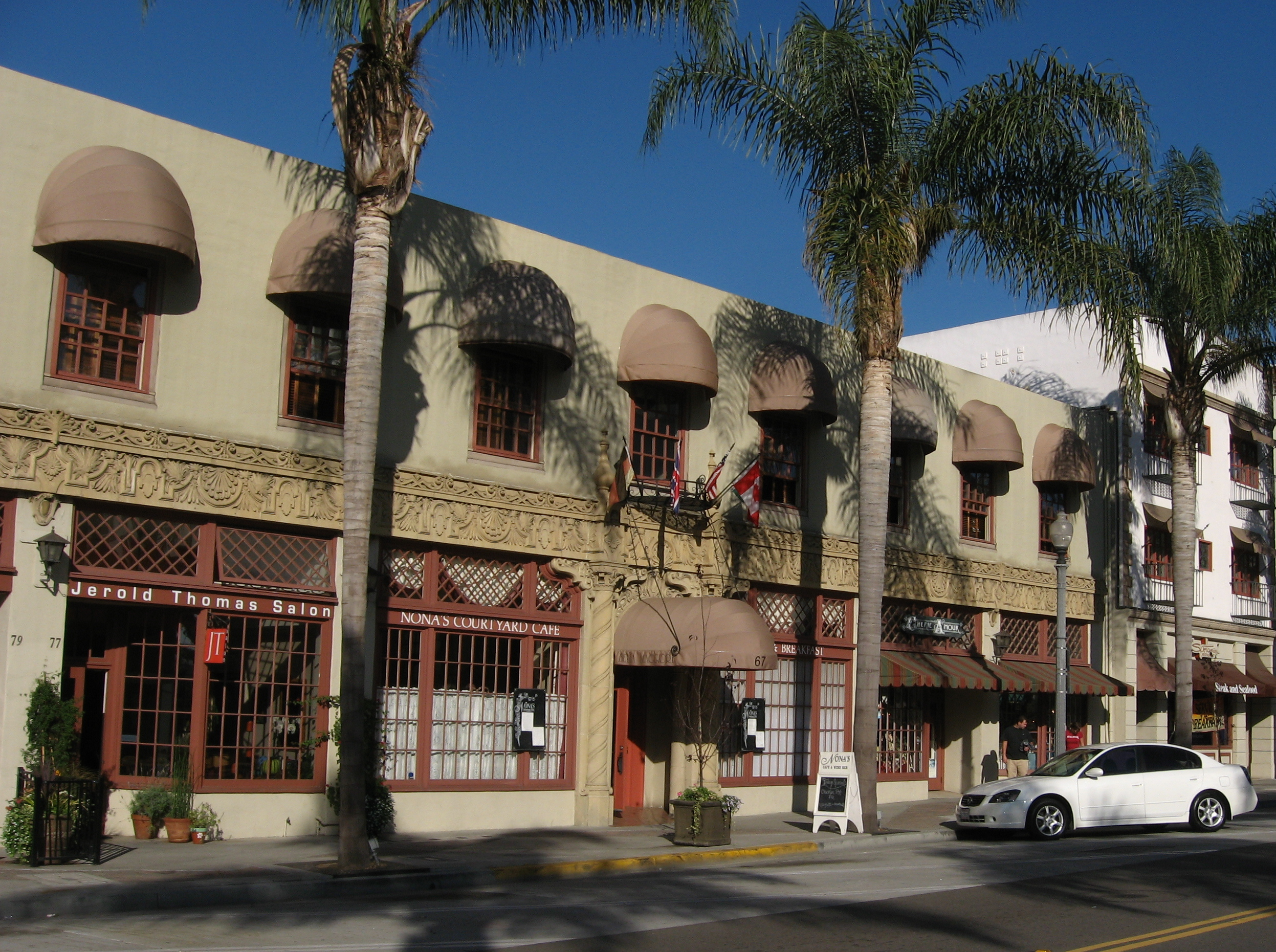
Historic California Churrigueresque architecture in Downtown Ventura

Downtown Ventura is home to the Mission San Buenaventura, museums, galleries, dining, and shopping. Located in downtown is the historic Ortega Adobe, once home to the Ortega family known for chili products. Downtown Ventura is home to Ventura's ornate city hall. Downtown includes restaurants, wine bars, breweries, and the Rubicon Theatre Company.

In Plaza Park (Chestnut and Santa Clara streets, downtown) stands a large Moreton Bay fig tree. Across the street, the main post office has murals on interior walls commissioned by the Section of Painting and Sculpture of the U.S. Treasury Department as New Deal art.

=== Other sites ===
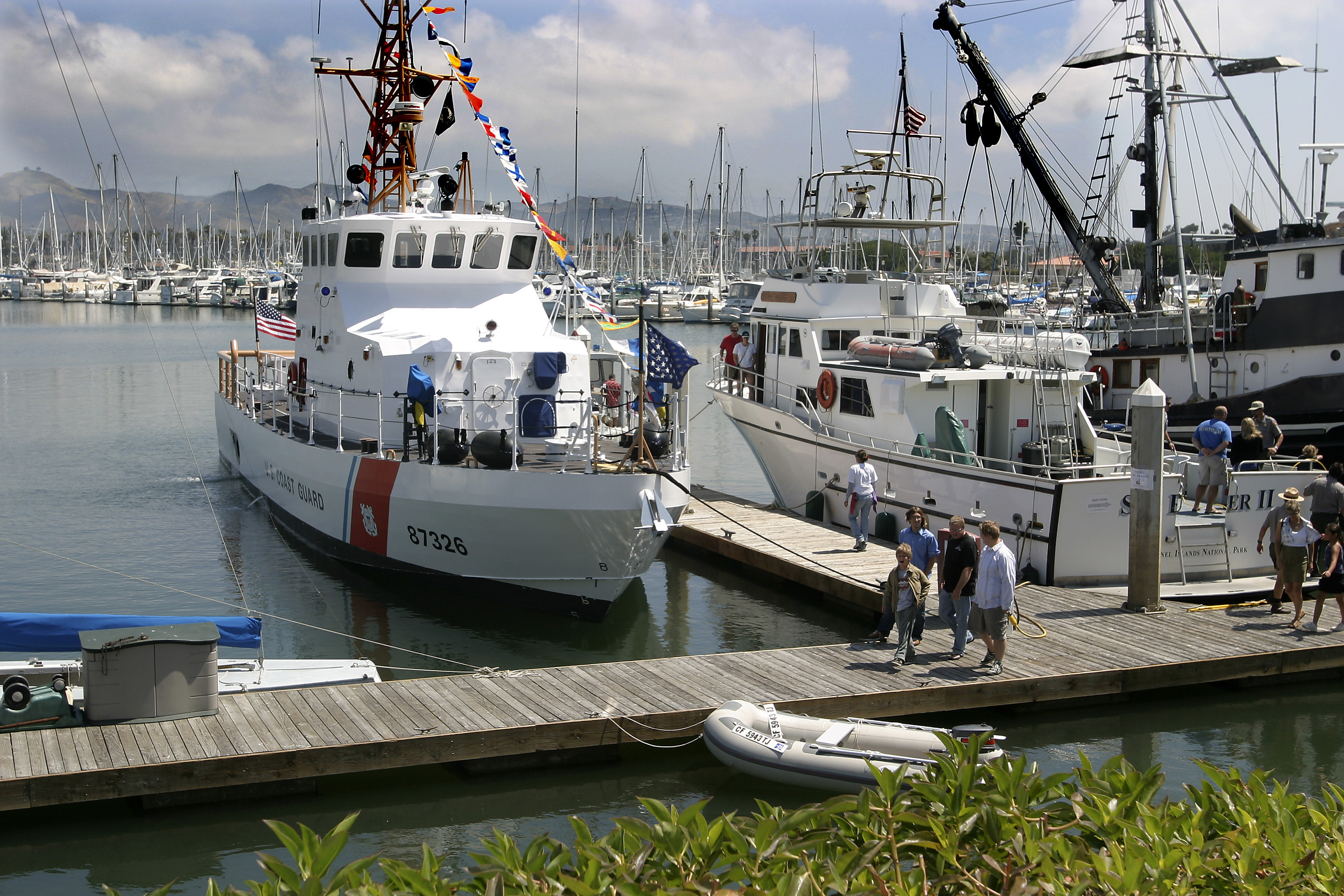
Ventura Harbor is the headquarters for the Channel Islands National Park.

Ventura Harbor has fishing boats, seafood restaurants and a retail center, the Ventura Harbor Village. The Channel Islands National Park Headquarters is also located at the harbor, and boats to the Channel Islands depart daily.

The Olivas Adobe, one of the early "California Rancho"-styled homes, is operated as a museum and performing arts venue. Living history reenactments, demonstrations of Rancho life and ghost stories are presented. A summer music series of performances held in the courtyard features an eclectic assortment of artists from blues to jazz to country.

"Two Trees" refers to two lone trees on a hilltop, visible from much of Ventura. Access to the hill is private property. In early October 2017, one of the trees was destroyed by high winds.

Temple Beth Torah is a Reform Jewish synagogue located in Ventura.

=== Libraries ===
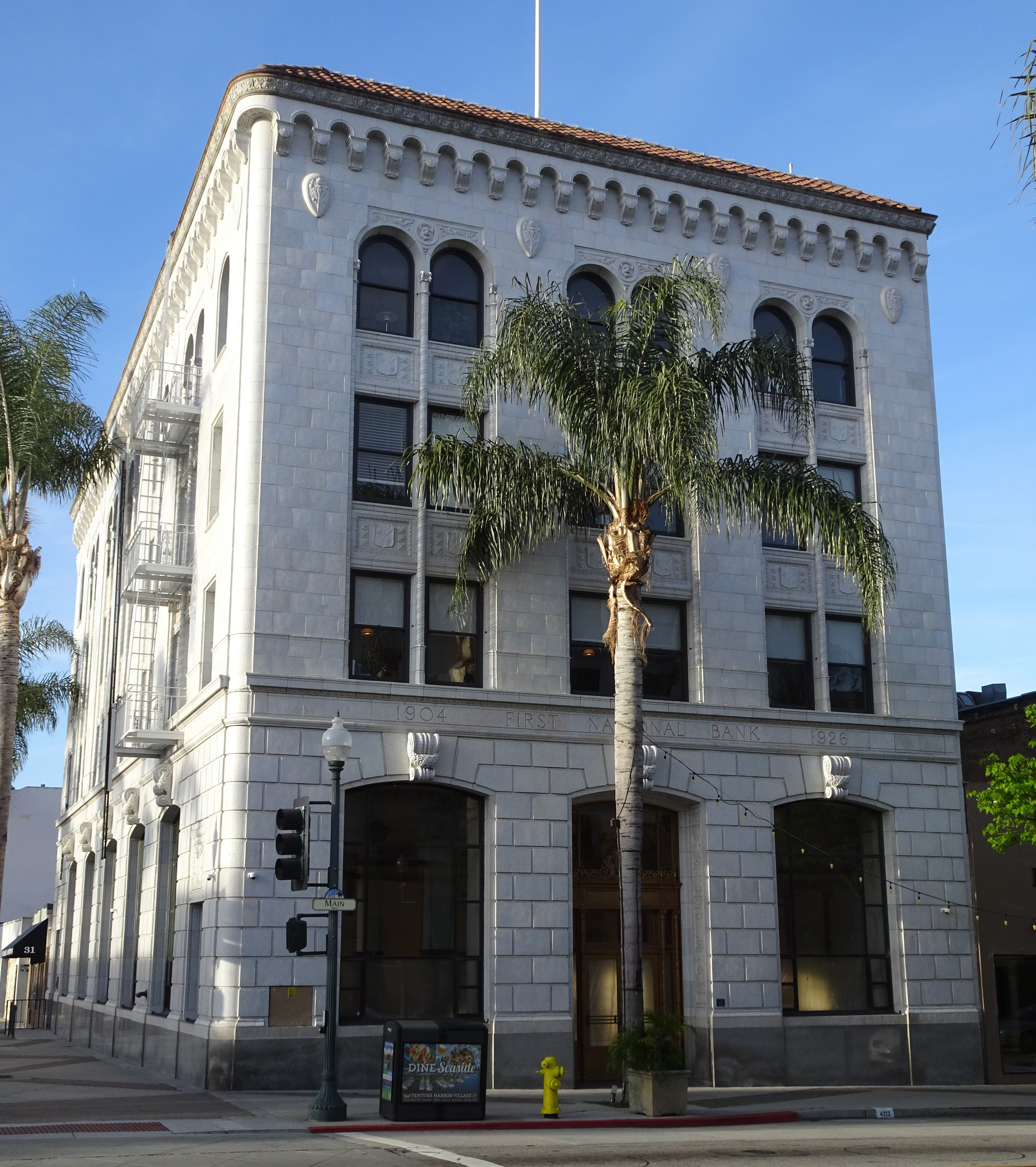
First National Bank of Ventura

There are three branches of the Ventura County Library in the City of Ventura: E.P. Foster Library on Main Street, Avenue Library on Ventura Avenue, and Hill Road Library on the east side of the city. Saticoy Library is in the unincorporated area of Saticoy outside the east end of the city of Ventura.

The Evelyn and Howard Boroughs Library of Ventura College, dedicated in 2005, serves the students, faculty and staff of the college as well as the general public of Ventura County.

The Research Library of the Museum of Ventura County holds books and archival materials related to the history of the county and surrounding regions. Its holdings are catalogued in the Ventura County Library system and the Central Coast Museum Consortium, and the library is open to the public.

Ventura County Law Library, located in the Ventura County Government Center, makes current legal resources available to judges, lawyers, government officials, and other users.

== Sports ==
Ventura is the home to the Ventura County Fusion Soccer Club of USL League Two. Ventura County Fusion, has won two national championships in 2009 and 2022.

Ventura is notable for the quality and frequency of the surfing conditions at spots such as Surfer's Point at Seaside Park. X Games California 2023 (Summer) event finals were scheduled for the adjacent Ventura County Fairgrounds.

Ventura is also home to the Ventura Raceway, a 1/5-mile (320 m) dirt track which hosts an array of auto racing events throughout the year, including the prestigious Turkey Night Grand Prix.

== Parks and recreation ==
The city Department of Parks and Recreation maintains multiple parks and provides residents with recreational amenities, programs and services.

=== Parks ===
The Department's Parks Division maintains 46 traditional city parks as well as neighborhood, pocket, and linear parks covering 800 acres (320 ha) including open spaces, sports fields, city beaches, community gardens, and the Ventura Aquatic Center, while also overseeing golf course services.

- Arroyo Verde Park
- Barranca Vista Park
- Blanche Reynolds Park
- Camino Real Park
- Cemetery Memorial Park
- Chumash Park
- Downtown Mini-Park
- Fritz Huntsinger Youth Sports Complex
- Grant Park
- Harry A. Lyon Park
- Hobert Park
- Juanamaria Park
- Junipero Serra Park
- Kellogg Park
- Marina Park
- Marion Cannon Park
- Mission Park
- Montalvo Hill Park
- Ocean Avenue Park
- Plaza Park
- Promenade Park
- Thille Park
- Ventura Community Park
- Westpark

==== Grant Park ====
In the city's Grant Park, the Ventura Botanical Gardens is located and within it and is maintained under a public-private partnership. A privately owned 1 acre (0.40 ha) parcel within Grant Park contains Serra Cross Park, maintained by the Serra Cross Conservancy.

=== Beaches ===
The City maintains two beach areas in Ventura, one stretch from the Ventura Pier to Surfers Point, across from the Ventura County Fairgrounds and adjacent to the Ventura Promenade; the second stretch is from Marina Park to Camden Lane. Other beaches in the city are maintained by the State and the Ventura Port District.

== Government ==
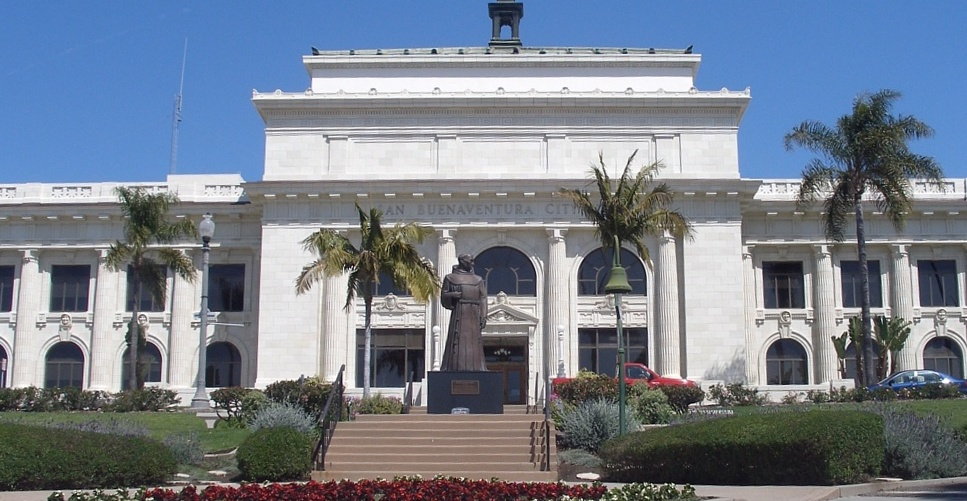
Historic San Buenaventura City Hall

Ventura had an at-large system of electing council members but changed to seven council districts in 2018 due to threatened legal action based on the California Voting Rights Act. Council members have four-year terms and their elections are staggered so three or four are up for re-election every two years. The council elects from among its own members a mayor and deputy mayor who serve two-year terms.

Jeannette Sanchez-Palacios was selected as Mayor of San Buenaventura in December 2024. Ventura is located within California's 24th congressional district, represented by Democrat Salud Carbajal.

== Education ==
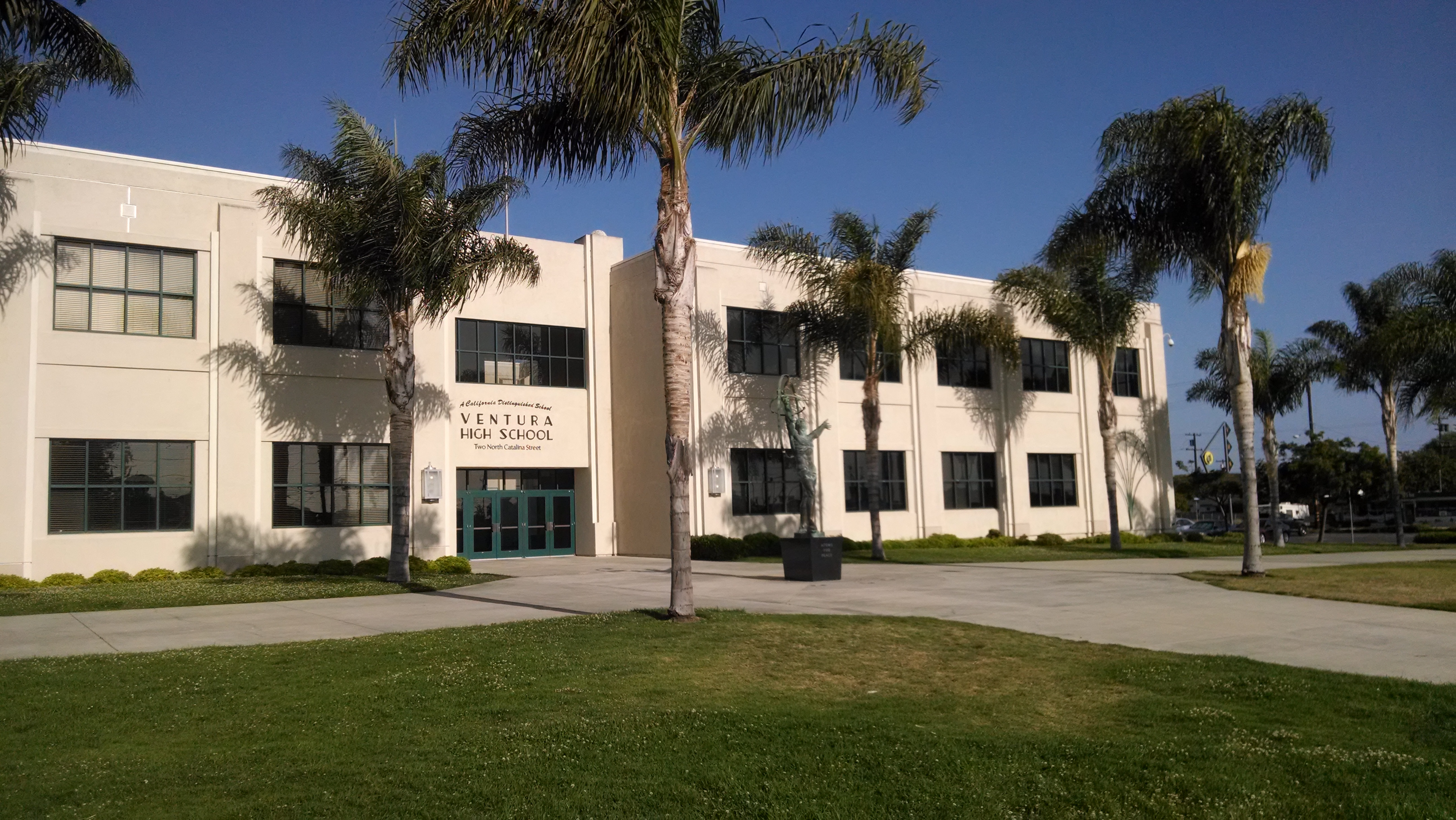
Ventura High School, est. 1889

Ventura has four college campuses: Ventura College of Law, Southern California Institute of Law, Santa Barbara Business College and Ventura College. Ventura College of Law is a non-profit law school founded in 1969. Ventura College is a community college, part of the Ventura County Community College District. The Brooks Institute of Photography shut down in 2016 after many years in the community.

Public school students from kindergarten through 12th grade attend schools in the Ventura Unified School District. The district has five high schools: Ventura High in the midtown area, Buena High in east Ventura, Foothill Technology High School, Pacific High School and El Camino High School, an independent study program located on the Ventura College campus. Private schools include St. Bonaventure High School, a Catholic school, Ventura County Christian School, Ventura Missionary School, evangelical Christian schools, and Holy Cross School, Sacred Heart, and Our Lady of the Assumption, Roman Catholic schools for grades pre-kindergarten through 8.

== Infrastructure ==
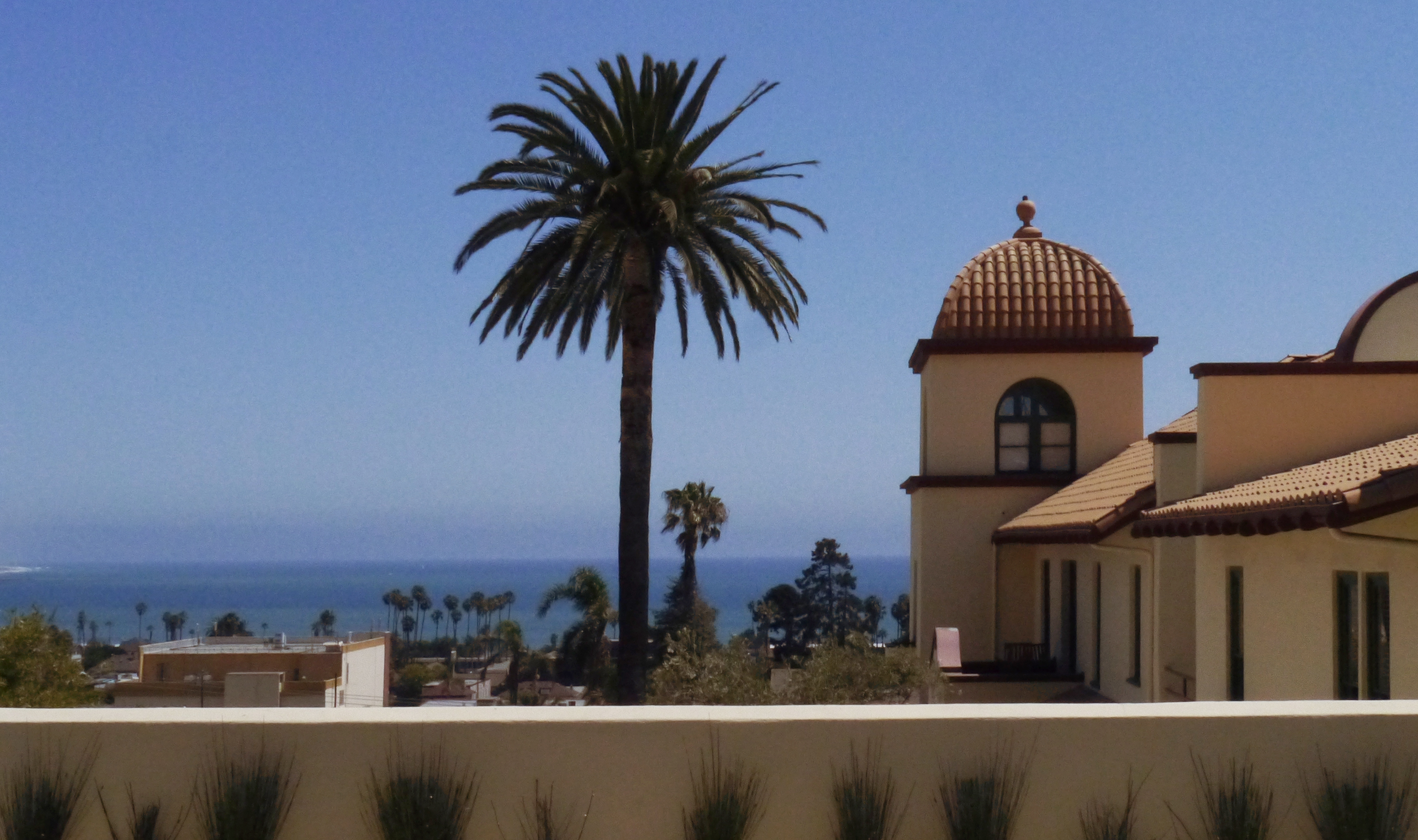
View of the Pacific Ocean from Elizabeth Bard Memorial Hospital

=== Transportation ===
The major road through Ventura is the Ventura Freeway (U.S. Route 101), connecting the California Central Coast and San Francisco to the north, and Los Angeles to the south. State Route 33, the Ojai Freeway, heads north to Ojai. State Route 126 and State Route 118 head east to Santa Clarita and Simi Valley, respectively.

Ventura–East station, in the historic Montalvo neighborhood, serves as the western terminus of the Ventura County Line of the Metrolink commuter rail system, which extends to Union Station in Los Angeles. The downtown Ventura Amtrak Station is served by Amtrak's Pacific Surfliner from San Luis Obispo to San Diego.

Local bus service is provided by Gold Coast Transit. Commuter and intercity bus services are provided by VCTC Intercity and by MTD to Santa Barbara.

=== Utilities ===
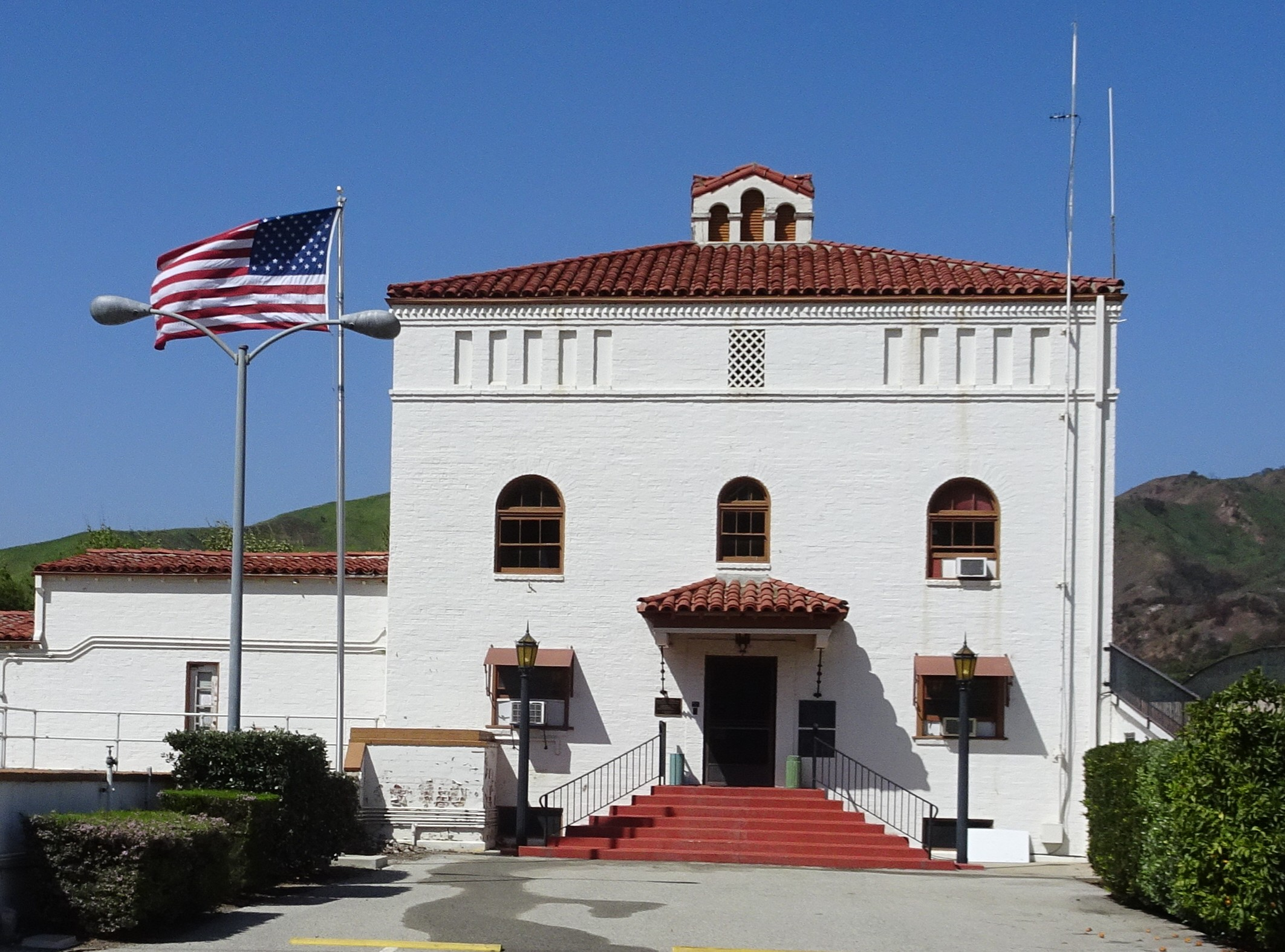
The historic Spanish Colonial style Ventura Ave. Water Treatment Plant

Ventura provides water to its residents and some unincorporated areas near the city. Water sources are Lake Casitas, the Ventura River, and groundwater. The water system includes 3 treatment plants, 10 wells, and 27 reservoirs. The city has rights to State Water Project since the early 1970s but has not built a connection to use the water.

Sanitary sewer services began treatment at a single plant in 1955. The plant, within a former portion of the estuary of the Santa Clara River, has ponds of treated water that attract birds. Some recycled water from the plant is used for landscaping and other non potable uses. Most of the water is released into the river just above the where it flows into the ocean.

The Montalvo Community Services District looked at the cost of a new treatment plant in 2014 and considered having the city take over their service area and dissolve the district. The Montalvo Municipal Improvement District had been formed 60 years prior to bringing sewer service to what was then a remote unincorporated area southeast of Ventura. The city of Ventura annexed the last unincorporated portions of Montalvo in 2012 and had already begun to provide water to the community before the annexation.

== Neighborhoods ==
- Arundell
- College
- Downtown
- Hillsides
- Hobson Heights
- Juanamaria
- Midtown
- Montalvo
- North Bank
- Olivias
- Pierpont
- Poinsettia
- Saticoy
- Serra
- Taylor Ranch
- Thille
- Wells
- Westside

== In popular culture ==
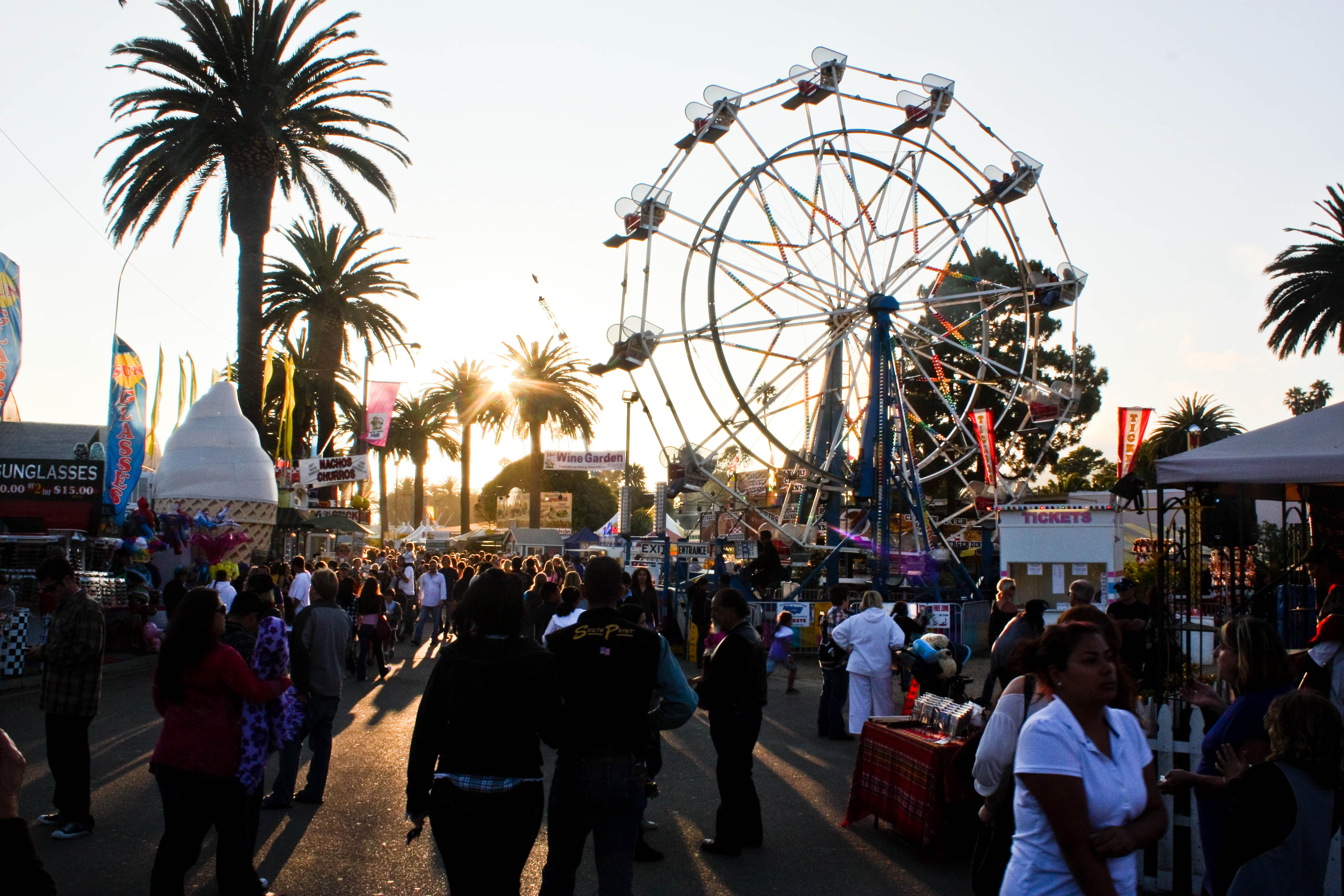
The Ventura County Fair, held annually at the Ventura Fairgrounds

=== Film ===
The movies Swordfish, Little Miss Sunshine and Erin Brockovich were partially filmed in Ventura.

The comedy film The Bet was filmed entirely in the city of Ventura and was written by Ventura residents Chris Jay and Aaron Goldberg, both members of the band Army of Freshmen.

=== Books ===
Ventura was fictionalized as "Madison City" by long-time resident Erle Stanley Gardner in his D.A. series of crime novels featuring Doug Selby, the crusading district attorney of a rural California county.

Ventura is the setting for Julie Carobini's 2007 book Chocolate Beach.

=== Music ===
The America song "Ventura Highway" was inspired by the feel of the coastal highway running through Ventura, when the songwriter saw the sign to Ventura on a childhood family trip.

The song "(Girl We got a) Good Thing" by Weezer mentions Ventura in the 2nd verse, where Rivers Cuomo sings "Or driving to Ventura on the 101."

=== Other ===
The macOS Ventura operating system was presented at Apple's Worldwide Developers Conference (WWDC2022) on June 6, 2022, after having been named after the city.

Ventura is a course in Tony Hawk's Pro Skater 2. It was called "Skatestreet Ventura" and based on the real-life indoor skate park called "Skate Street".

== Notable people ==
- Jamaal Wilkes — Hall of fame basketball player, attended Cabrillo Middle School and Ventura High School
- Anderson .Paak — Grammy-nominated rapper, singer, songwriter, record producer, and drummer; attended Foothill Technology High School and named his fourth studio album Ventura
- Jaime Ambriz — soccer player
- Curren Caples — skateboarder
- Frank Churchill — composer for Disney, began his career in Ventura
- George Christie — long-time president of the Hells Angels Ventura chapter.
- Cirith Ungol — heavy metal band who formed in Ventura in 1972 and are still active
- Matt Corral — NFL quarterback for the Carolina Panthers
- Kevin Costner — actor, attended Buena High School
- Michael P. Drescher – associate justice of the Vermont Supreme Court; born in Ventura
- James Ennis III — basketball player for the Philadelphia 76ers, born in Ventura
- Erle Stanley Gardner (1889–1970) — lawyer and writer, created the fictional lawyer Perry Mason
- Natasha Halevi — actress and director, attended Saint Bonaventure High School
- Kyle — rapper, attended Ventura High School
- Zachary Levi — actor, attended Buena High School
- Rhylan Thomas — outfielder for the Seattle Mariners
- Fernando Librado (1839–1915) — Chumash elder and master builder of the tomol born at Mission San Buenaventura. He worked extensively with John Peabody Harrington in his later life to record much about the Chumash people, language, and culture.
- Cameron Rising — quarterback for the Utah Utes
- Theodosia Burr Shepherd (1845–1906) — botanist, horticulturist and pioneer in plant breeding; called the "Flower Wizard of California", first woman to hybridize flowers
- Steven Thrasher (born 1978) — journalist and academic
- Sami Whitcomb (born 1988) — WNBA shooting guard for the Seattle Storm
- Connor Storrie (born 2000) — actor, was brought up in Ventura

== Sister cities ==
- Loreto, Baja California Sur (Mexico)

== See also ==
- Foster Park Bowl
- City of Ventura Historic Landmarks and Districts
