= Urbita Lake Railway =

Miniature rideable railway in California

Coordinates: 34.0849282°N 117.2972699°W

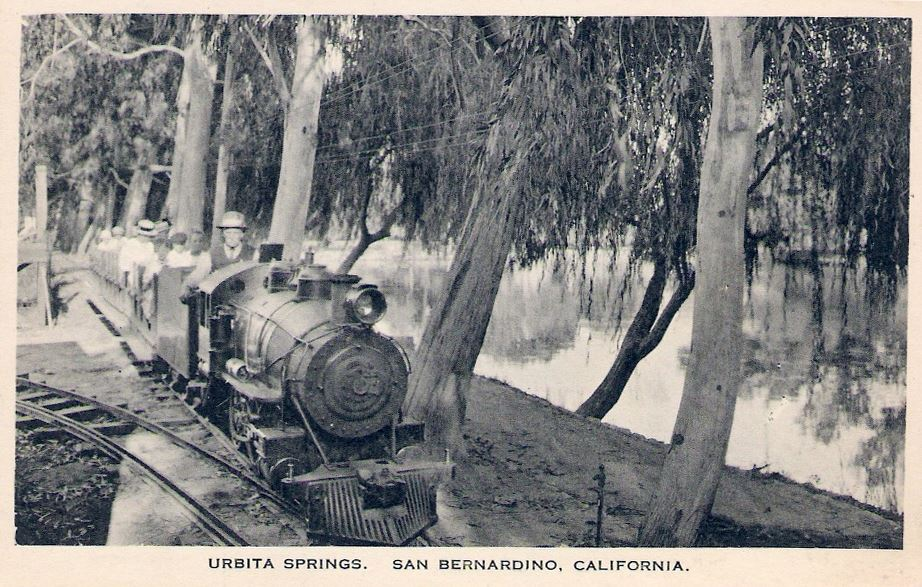
- Urbita Springs, San Bernardino, California

Technical
- Line length: 1/2 mile (0.8 km)
- Track gauge: 18 in (457 mm)

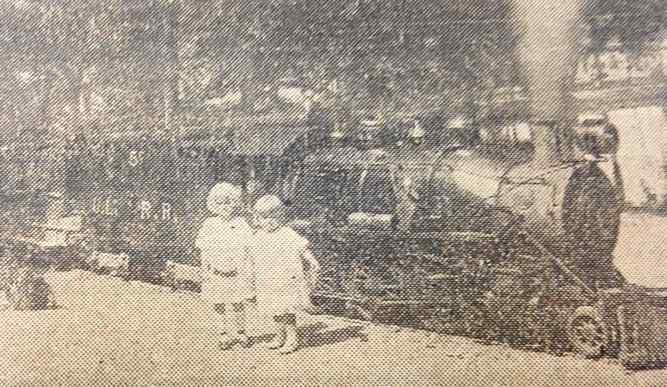
‘Buddy’ Courcy (right), youngest railway president, and his train, 1915.

The Urbita Lake Railway was a 1/2 mile (0.8 km) long miniature railway with a gauge of 18 in (457 mm), which operated from approximately 1910 to at least August 1915 at Urbita Hot Springs park (since 1966 the location of the Inland Center shopping mall) in San Bernardino, California.

== History ==
In 1910, the Pacific Electric Railway took-over the San Bernardino Valley Traction Company and thus became owner of the Urbita Hot Springs. At this time the Hot Springs were a very profitable business, which had been originally developed by R. Paragette in 1901.

According to a contemporary newspaper, the railroad was unique, because it had probably the youngest president and oldest engineer in the world, the president being Buster ‘Buddy’ Courcy, at the age of two, and the engineer being the retired railway worker Bill Simpson from the San Bernardino Valley.

== Locomotive ==
The locomotive had been built as (Original) No 1903 by John J. Coit and has previously been used on the Long Beach and Asbury Park Railway, the Venice Miniature Railway and the Eastlake Park Scenic Railway. The oilfired steam locomotive with a total length of 5.80 m (19.0 feet) from tip of pilot to end of tank couple and a height of 1,295 mm (51.0 inches) from the top of rail to the top of stack was of the 2-6-0 type. The locomotive had some technical innovations, such as a valve control without eccentrics, which was easy to adjust and to maintain. The locomotive had automatic couplings and a bespoke oil burner, for which Coit filed a patent.

The locomotive had a weight of 3,628 kg (7,998 lb) including the tender, and 2,328 kg (5,132 lb) excluding the tender. The tender had a capacity of 780 L (210 US gallons; 170 imperial gallons) water and 322 L (85 US gallons; 71 imperial gallons) oil. The weight of the locomotive was spread over six driving wheels with a diameter of 463 mm (18.23 inches) and two smaller wheels of a pony truck with the diameter of 254 mm (10 inches) onto the rails. The Vanderbilt type boiler had a maximum pressure of 10 bar (150 psi; 1,000 kPa) and delivered 25 hp (19 kW). The cylinders were 5 by 7 inches (127.0 mm × 177.8 mm) bore x stroke. The locomotive had a pulling power of 4.8 kN (1,100 lbf).

== See also ==
- Billy Jones Wildcat Railroad
- Eastlake Park Scenic Railway
- Long Beach and Asbury Park Railway
- Seaside Park Railway
- Venice Miniature Railway
