= Seaside Park (Ventura) =

Ventura County Fairgrounds and event venue in Ventura, California

- Ventura County Fairgrounds
- Interactive map of Seaside Park
- Location: 10 West Harbor Boulevard; Ventura, California
- Coordinates: 34°16′31″N 119°18′13″W
- Area: 62 acres (25 ha)
- Founder: Eugene Preston Foster and Orpha Foster
- Owner: State of California
- Administrator: 31st District Agricultural Association
- Public transit: Ventura–Downtown/Beach train station
- Website: www.venturacountyfair.org

Seaside Park (commonly known as the Ventura County Fairgrounds) is an event venue in Ventura, California, United States. The 62-acre site (25 ha) is the home of the Ventura County Fair. Trade shows, concerts, and other events are held throughout the year at the fairgrounds. The beachfront site, near the mouth of the Ventura River, also includes Surfers' Point, known for its point break that produces distinctive waves.

The original 65 acres (26 ha) were donated to the County of Ventura by Eugene Preston Foster and Orpha Foster, who envisioned the Seaside Park as a miniature Golden Gate Park. The Fosters wanted a beautiful gateway to Ventura, where families could walk and picnic, play tennis, and enjoy family outings. Most of the site is now owned by the State of California and is managed by the 31st District Agricultural Association, an independent state agency.

== Events and activities ==
=== Fairgrounds ===
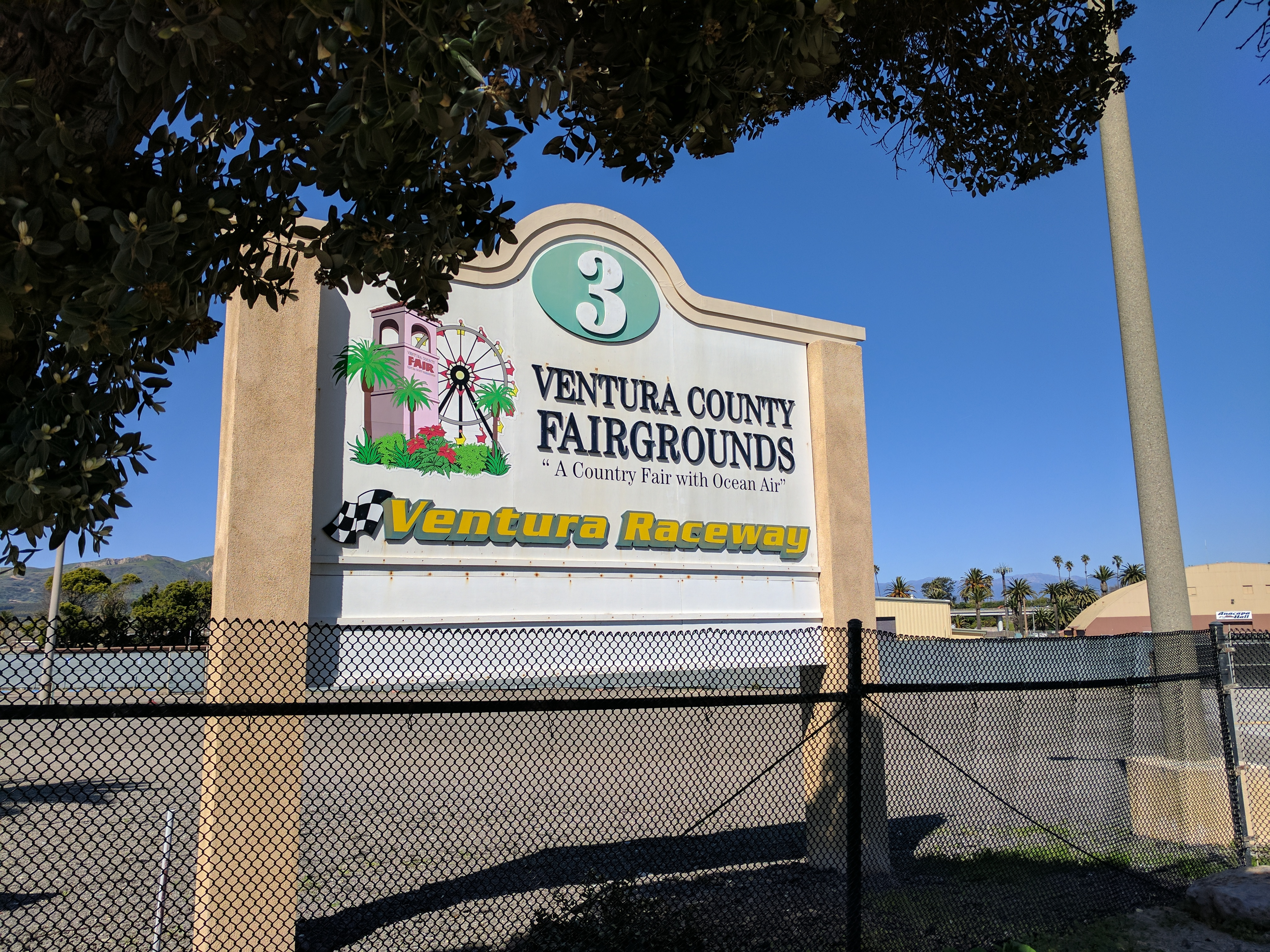
Ventura County Fair sign

The 31st District Agricultural Association is a state special-purpose district in the Division of Fairs and Expositions of the California Department of Food and Agriculture. The Fair Board's role is to set and approve policies for the organization. Members of the Board of Directors are appointed by the governor of California. They organize the annual Ventura County Fair. The Derby Club is a live via satellite horse racing off-track wagering facility that leases a building.

Events are held throughout the year, including trade shows, conventions, concerts, and festivals. The year-round facility has convention facilities, demonstration halls, equestrian facilities which include an 110,000 square feet (10,000 m^{2}) arena, and administrative offices. The California Strawberry Festival is an annual 2-day event held on the third weekend in May. Although the original race track and grandstand are long gone, the Ventura Raceway is hosted at the fairgrounds when the fair is not in season.

The Thousand Oaks shooting at the Borderline dance bar in November 2018 was a month before the last gun show of the year at the fairgrounds. While considering the 2019 season, the fair board only approved the first two gun shows of the new year with the desire to prepare a policy before approving the three additional gun shows requested by the company that produces them. A state law was passed prohibiting the sale of firearms and ammunition on state property such as Seaside Park effective January 1, 2023.

=== Public recreation ===
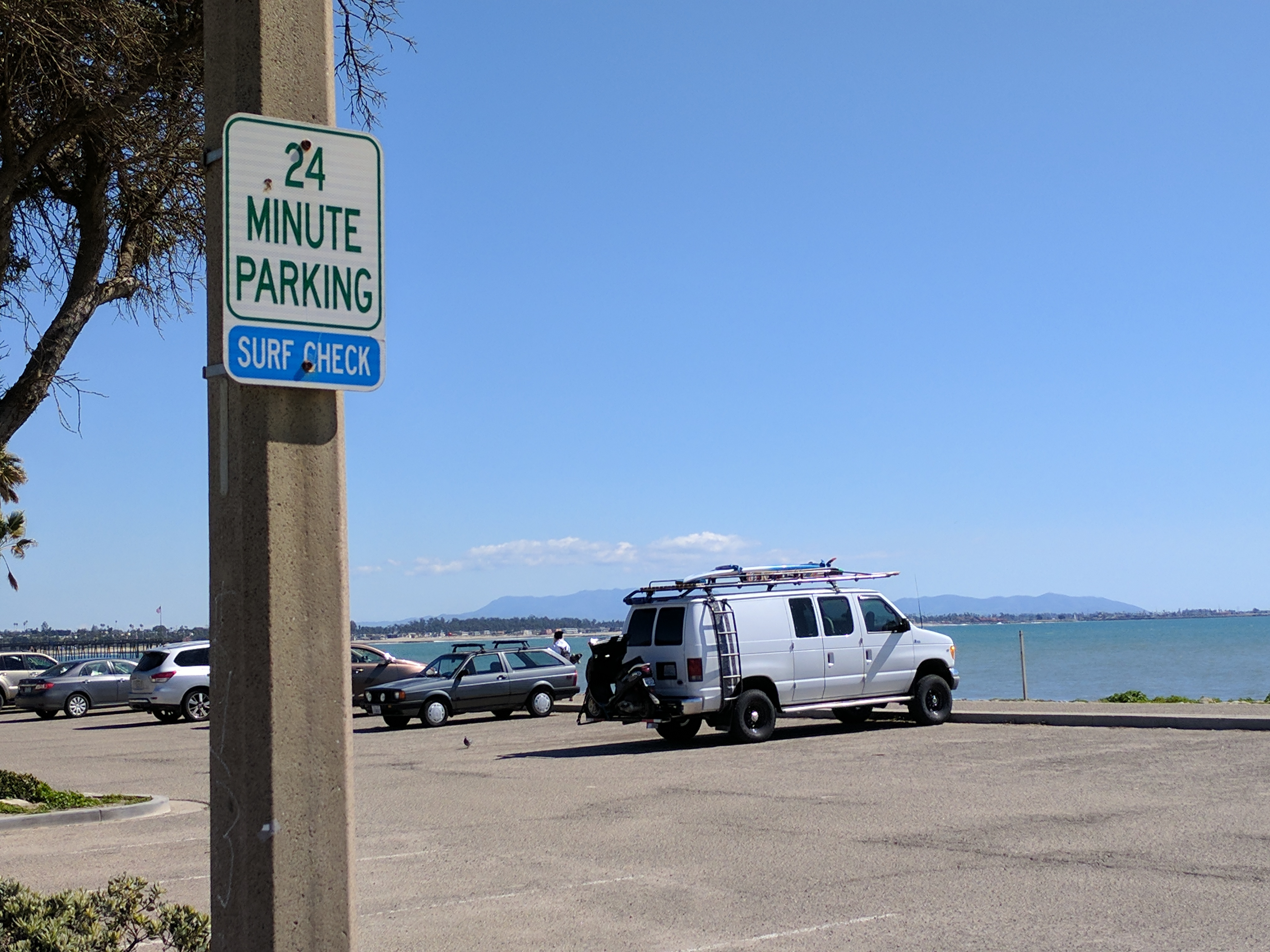
Surf Check parking sign

The Omer Rains Bike Trail lies outside the fairgrounds fence running along the beach and river levee. Connecting the San Buenaventura State Beach to the south and Emma Wood State Beach to the north, the path is on the Pacific Coast Bicycle Route and also serves as an access point for California Coastal Trail. Surfing is popular here with its point break that produces distinctive waves.

=== X Games ===
X Games California 2023 (Summer) event finals which includes skateboarders, BMXers and Moto X riders were held at the fairgrounds in July 2023. Preparation included constructing a street arena for skateboarders and BMX athletes styled to look like a schoolyard with rails, benches and stairs; a skateboard and BMX park that looks like a California backyard, complete with a fire pit and a working hot tub; and massive mounds of dirt, sculpted into a high-air course for motocross riders. The return of skateboarder Tony Hawk was featured at the event. Ventura native and professional skateboarder Curren Caples performed in the men's elimination street event.

== History ==
Eugene P. and Orpha Foster envisioned a miniature Golden Gate Park since John McLaren, the designer of that park, was a family friend. They donated the original 65 acres (26 ha) to the County of Ventura, adding another 14 acres (5.7 ha) later. They wanted a beautiful gateway to Ventura, where families could walk and picnic, play tennis, and enjoy family outings.

=== Historical uses ===
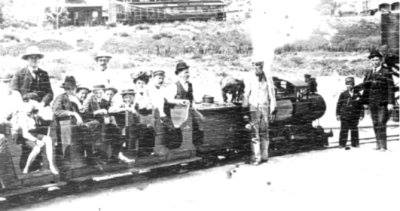
John J. Coit's locomotive at the Seaside Park in California. John Coit and his conductor "Shorty" Chase are shown just in front of the locomotive.

Around 1901, John J. Coit installed and operated a miniature railway in Seaside Park, probably with the unusual gauge of 14 1/2 in (368 mm). The locomotive, which Coit had designed, was of the camelback type. After a short period of time, he relocated some of the equipment to the Long Beach and Asbury Park Railway.

For many years, Babe Ruth Field occupied the area of the main parking lot and served as the home of the Ventura Braves, Ventura Yankees, and Ventura Oilers professional baseball teams.

=== Modern projects ===
The bike path along the shore was refurbished in 1989. Within a couple of years that path was again damaged by coastal erosion and began to fail. Initially, fair officials wanted a buried sea wall to protect the bike path that had been damaged. Surfers fiercely objected, fearing that this would destroy the point break near the Ventura River that generates the distinctive waves at Surfers' Point at Seaside Park, the city park area. Environmentalists projected reduced habitat and increased erosion rates on nearby beaches by the altered wave patterns. In 2011, the popular bike and pedestrian path was moved inland as part of a managed retreat project, a first of its kind in California. Cobble was placed 8 feet (2.4 m) deep and covered with sand dunes that would allow the beach to act similarly to how it would under natural conditions. During the 2022-2033 storms with big swells, the project area responded really well with no damage to the dunes. The first phase completed 1,000 feet (300 m) east from the mouth of the Ventura River. The second phase of 800 feet (240 m), funded by the California Coastal Conservancy, will complete the project.

== In popular culture ==
In 1922, a horse race was filmed here for The Pride of Palomar, a movie bankrolled by newspaper magnate William Randolph Hearst's Cosmopolitan Pictures.

In 1927, Racing Romeo, a saga about a young race car driver starring football great Red Grange, used the fairground track.

== See also ==
- Billy Jones Wildcat Railroad
- Eastlake Park Scenic Railway
- Long Beach and Asbury Park Railway
- Venice Miniature Railway
- Urbita Lake Railway
