= Eastlake Park Scenic Railway =

Miniature railway in Los Angeles

Coordinates: 34.066667°N 118.201111°W

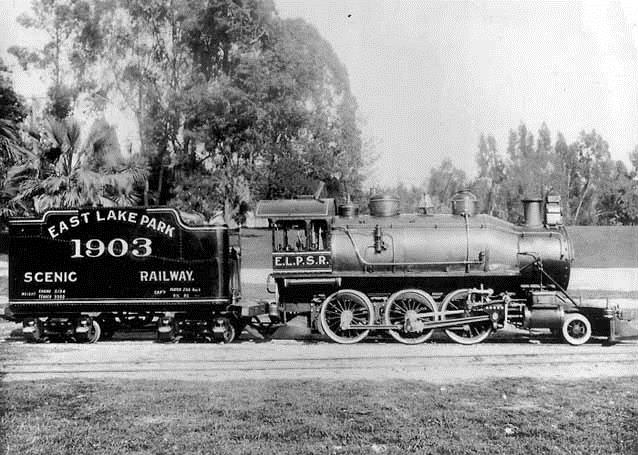
- Loco No 1903 of the Eastlake Park Scenic Railway

Technical
- Line length: 984 m (3,228 feet)
- Track gauge: 18 in (457 mm)
- Maximum incline: 7 %

The Eastlake Park Scenic Railway was a 984 m (3,228 feet) long miniature railway in the 1:3 scale with a gauge of 18 in (457 mm), which operated from 19 May 1904 to 11 May 1905 in the Eastlake Park (now Lincoln Park) in Los Angeles in California.

== Track ==
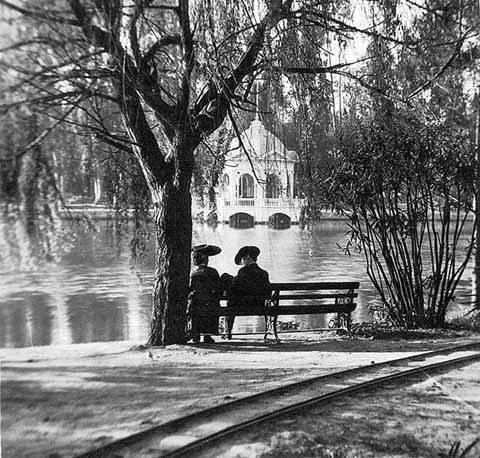
Track at the lake

The nearly one kilometer (0.62 mi) long narrow gauge railroad lead from the lake to the hills in the Eastlake Park, which is now called Lincoln Park. It started at the Lakeside Station near the main entrance of the park. From there the track crossed one of the lake's arms on a steel and concrete trestle bridge into a pampas grass plantation. After a bend the track continued on the perimeter of the park and along the railway line of the Southern Pacific Railroad across a driveway bordered with large fan palms. It winded through a small forest of sub-tropical shrubs and reached then Hillside Station. Here was the locomotive shed and a double-track area, in which the locomotive could be driven to the other end of the train before the return journey commenced. Hillside Station had also a water tower and an oil tank, as well as some sidings and a ticket booth.

The railway had five switches. The rails had a flattened T-shaped Vignoles profile and a weight of 8 lb/yd (3.97 kg/m). Including the sidings the track had an overall length of 1,045 m (3,428 feet). More than 1,700 sleepers were used. The tightest curve had a radius of 16.5 m (54 feet). The Hillside Station laid 5.4 m (17 feet 9 inches) above the Lakeside Station and the maximum grade was 7 % on a 9 m (29.53 feet) long section.

== History ==
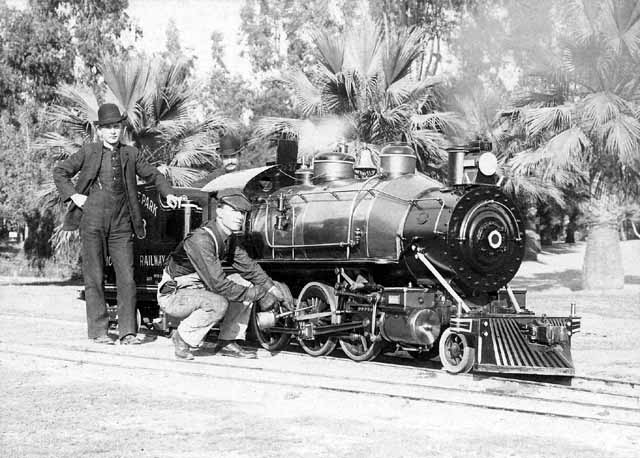
John J. Coit at the tender and ‚Shorty‘ Chase on the footplate (both with bowler hats) behind the fireman

John J. Coit built the track of miniature railway and designed and probably even manufactured the steam locomotive. He had worked as a master machinist at the Johnson Machine Works, before he built and operated the profitable but short-lived Long Beach and Asbury Park Railway. Due to being physically handicapped for two years when he designed the locomotive he focused on a user friendly design. He was friend 'Shorty‘ Chase was a person of short stature and wore a suit and a bowler hat as a conductor on all of Coit's railways.

Abbot Kinney, the developer of Venice of America, was impressed by the railway and contracted Coit to build the Venice Miniature Railway on an estate in Venice Beach near Los Angeles. Coit transported his locomotive temporarily to Venice because of the delayed delivery of a new locomotive originally intended for 1903. Built in from 1906 to 1920 and because the permit to operate the railway line in Eastlake Park had been cancelled, on 11 May 1905 it was sold at auction for use on the new railway, which was inaugurated with the opening of the park on 4 July 1905.

Coit returned in 1908 to Eastlake Park after a legal dispute with Kinney, and operated his locomotive No 1903 and three cars for approximately two years until around 1910. Later he transported his equipment to the Urbita Hot Springs Railway.

== Locomotive ==
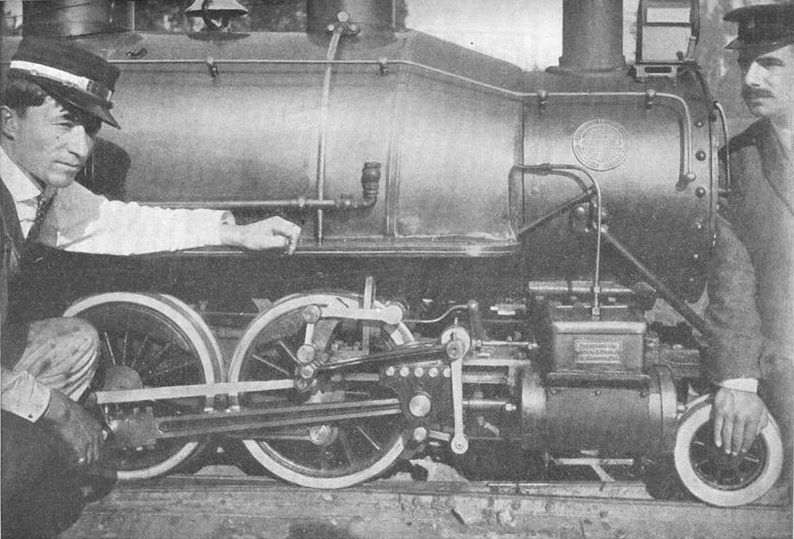
Coit (on the left) shows his innovative and easily accessible valve control without eccentrics

The oil-fired steam locomotive No. 1903, with a total length of 5.8 m (19 ft 0 in) from tip of pilot to end of tank couple and a height of 1,295 mm (51 inches) from the top of rail to the top of stack was of the 2-6-0 type. The locomotive had some technical innovations, such as a valve control without eccentrics, which was easy to adjust and to maintain. The locomotive had automatic couplings and a bespoke oit burner, for which Coit filed a patent.

The locomotive had a weight of 3,628 kg (7,998 lb) including the tender, and 2,328 kilograms (5,132 lb) (5,134 lbs) excluding the tender. The tender had a capacity of 780 L (210 US gal; 170 imp gal) water and 322 L (85 US gallons; 71 imperial gallons) oil. The weight of the locomotive was spread over six driving wheels with a diameter of 463 mm (18.2 in) and two smaller wheels of a pony truck with the diameter of 254 mm (10 in) onto the rails. The Vanderbilt type boiler had a maximum pressure of 10 bar (150 psi; 1,000 kPa) and delivered 25 horsepower (19 kW). The cylinders were 5 by 7 inches (127.0 mm × 177.8 mm) bore x stroke. The locomotive had a pulling power of 4.8 kN (1,100 lbf).

== Carriages ==
The passenger cars were suspended with helical coil springs on conventional bogies. They each had ten seats and were 4.26 m (14.0 feet) long and 0.96 m (3.1 feet) wide. They had a weight of 680 kg (1,500 lb) each and had Coit's automatic couplings at both ends.

== See also ==
- Billy Jones Wildcat Railroad
- Long Beach and Asbury Park Railway
- Seaside Park Railway
- Venice Miniature Railway
- Urbita Lake Railway
