= E. P. Foster =

Eugene Preston Foster
- Born: April 4, 1848; Joliet, Illinois, US
- Died: February 12, 1932 (aged 83); Ventura, California, US
- Occupation(s): Rancher, entrepreneur, banker, and philanthropist
- Years active: 1871–1931
- Known for: Foster Park, Seaside Park, Camp Comfort

Eugene Preston Foster (April 4, 1848 – February 12, 1932), commonly known as E. P. Foster, was a rancher, entrepreneur, banker, and philanthropist in Ventura County, California.

A native of Illinois, he moved to California and, in the early 1870s, settled in Ventura County. His early ventures included sheep ranching, managing a local water company, developing natural gas wells along the Ventura River, and planting and operating an apricot orchard. He then acquired an interest in the Bank of Ventura and served as its president from 1890 to 1917, when it was acquired by the Bank of Italy. He also invested in the Union Oil Company of California.

Foster became known as one of the area's most important philanthropists in the early 20th century. He established and donated several parks, including Camp Comfort, Foster Memorial Park, and Seaside Park. He also planted trees throughout the City and County of Ventura and donated Ventura's main public library, the E. P. Foster Library. He also helped fund the construction of Community Memorial Hospital, which was known as the E. P. Foster Memorial Hospital from approximately 1932 to 1962.

The Foster family house at 2717 North Ventura Avenue, built in 1881, was donated to the Ventura School District in 1955. It fell into disrepair and was destroyed by fire in 2010.

== Early years ==
Foster was born in 1848 in Joliet, Illinois. He moved west with his family in the 1850s, taking an overland route in a covered wagon. The family settled in northern California. Foster grew up near Half Moon Bay.

== Business career ==
Foster moved to Goleta, California, in 1867, and to Ventura County in the early 1870s. He bought land in the Santa Clara Valley and went into the sheep business.

Foster was married to Orpha Woods (1850–1938) at the Barron Ranch (later the site of the California State School for Girls) in Ventura in August 1874. They lived after their marriage on the Rancho El Conejo where Foster operated his sheep business, grazing on portions of the Ranchos Conejo, Simi, and Las Posas. By 1875, Foster's herd had grown to 10,000 head.

After a drought destroyed Foster's sheep business in 1877, he sold what was left of his herd and moved to Ventura, where he worked for W. S. Chaffee's Santa Ana Water Company that supplied water to Ventura. Foster and his wife lived in a house on Chaffee's orchard on Ventura Avenue.

In the early 1880s, Foster partnered with G. W. Chrisman to establish Ventura's first electric light plant and ice plant. He also developed natural gas wells along the Ventura River and planted a large apricot orchard on the J. W. Day ranch to the east of Ventura.

Foster also became active in banking. He sold his interest in the apricot orchards to invest $10,00 in the Bank of Ventura. He became the bank's cashier and later its president from 1890 to 1917. When the Bank of Ventura was acquired by the Bank of Italy (later Bank of America), Foster served on that bank's advisory board. Foster also invested in the Union Oil Company, and much of his wealth came from his oil and banking investments.

== Philanthropy ==
Foster was also known for his leadership in civic affairs and his philanthropy. Parks and recreation were a particular focus of Foster's efforts. He is responsible for the creation of Ventura County's park system and had a direct role as benefactor in three of the County's early parks:

- Camp Comfort - In 1904, Foster and K. P. Grant purchased land along San Antonio Creek on the Creek Road to Ojai. The land, which included a mature grove of live oak and sycamore trees, gave the land to Ventura County as the county's first park.
- Foster Park and Foster Bowl - In 1906, Foster donated land along the Ventura River and Coyote Creek, an area known as the Casitas woods, to the county. The land was given for the establishment of a public park to be known as the Eugene C. Foster Memorial Park, a memorial to Foster's son who died at age seven. Foster's initial gift consisted of 30 acres. Two lions carved out of Sespe sandstone were added at the entrance to the park in 1907 and 1908. By 1909, the park had grown to 92 acres with additional land donated by G. W. Chrisman and the Ventura Power Company. In 1928, the Foster Bowl, an outdoor theater with seating for 1,000 persons, was dedicated at the western end of the park. Foster and his wife were introduced at the dedication.
- Seaside Park - In 1909, Foster deeded 65 acres at the mouth of the Ventura River to the County on the condition it be used "as a public park and place of recreation and pleasure ground for the amusement, health and pleasure of the general park." Foster acquired another 26 acres of beach frontage in 1926 that was added to the park. Foster had planned that it would be developed in the same manner as San Francisco's Golden Gate Park, with tall trees and areas to walk, picnic, and enjoy the ocean. The Ventura County Fair began operating on a portion of Seaside Park in 1917.
- Trees - Foster also funded and planted trees throughout the City and County of Ventura. The trees planted by Foster include the Mission Norfolk Pines that were designated as Ventura Historic Landmark No. 8 in 1974.

Foster's philanthropy extended to other civic projects as well. In 1921, Foster donated a building at Chestnut and Main Streets to the city to serve as a library and city hall. The building no longer functions as city hall, and library was expanded in 1959 with a new structure built in front of the original. The original structure remains, located behind the current E. P. Foster Library. Shortly after the opening of the new library and city hall, the City and County of Ventura celebrated "Foster Day" on September 5, 1921.

As a further tribute to Foster, an elementary school on Ventura Avenue was named the "E. P. Foster School". Foster was the guest of honor at the cornerstone laying ceremony on January 3, 1930. The school continues to operate, and as of 2018, had 540 students from preschool to fifth grade.

Foster's final major philanthropic effort was in the area of health care. By the late 1920s, Ventura's needs had outgrown the Elizabeth Bard Memorial Hospital, which was then known as Big Sisters Hospital. Foster led the effort to build the new hospital, donating farmland on the east side of the city and agreeing to pay any shortfall between the public donations and the construction costs projected at $250,000. Foster laid the cornerstone at a ceremony held on June 2, 1930. Foster's contribution to the cost of construction has been variously reported as $50,000 or $100,000. Originally known as the Hospital de Bueneaventura, the hospital was named the E. P. Foster Memorial Hospital after Foster died in 1932. In 1962, it was renamed Community Memorial Hospital.

== Family and death ==
Foster and his wife Orpha had 10 children, four of whom died in infancy. Five daughters survived to adulthood: Orpha (referred to as Pearl), born 1875; Grace, born 1879; Edith, born 1881; Ida, born 1885; and Mildred, born 1892. A son, Eugene, died of pneumonia at age seven.

Foster died in 1932 at age 83 at his home in Ventura. Orpha died in 1938.

== E. P. Foster house ==
The Foster house at 2717 N. Ventura Avenue in Ventura was built by Foster in 1881. The house was a gathering place for Venturans while the Fosters were alive. A historian with the San Buenaventura Conservancy later called the house "the most socially significant structure in Ventura." The house and Avenue School were donated by Foster's oldest daughter to the Ventura School District in 1955. The City's Historic Preservation Committee attempted to designate the house as a historic landmark, but the effort was defeated due to opposition from the school district.

In its later years, the house was fenced off, vacant, and fell into disrepair. The house was consumed by fire in the early morning hours on August 4, 2010. Despite the efforts of 27 firefighters, the building was fully consumed and destroyed in the fire.
