= Long Beach and Asbury Park Railway =

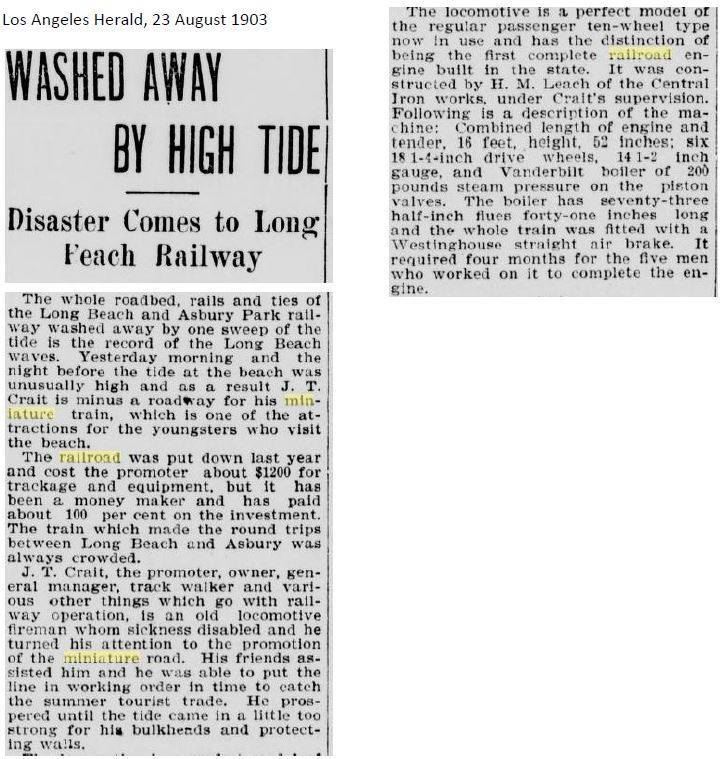
- Disaster Comes to Long Beach Railway^{(Los Angeles Herald, 23 August 1903)}

Technical
- Track gauge: 14 1/2 in (368 mm)

The Long Beach and Asbury Park Railway was a profitable but short-lived miniature railway with the unusual gauge of 14 1/2 in (368 mm), which operated from 1902 until 21 August 1903 at Long Beach in California.

== History ==
John J. Coit, an experienced locomotive driver, built the track of miniature railway together with his friends at cost of $1,200. He had previously worked as a master machinist at the Johnson Machine Works. Due to being physically handicapped, he focused on a user-friendly design of his locomotives.

In the night from 21 to 22 August 1903, the whole roadbed, rails and ties of the Long Beach and Asbury Park Railway were washed away by a historic high tide. With the experience gained, Coit did not rebuild the track at this location, instead building the Eastlake Park Scenic Railway (opened on 19 May 1904) and the Venice Miniature Railway (opened on 4 July 1905) with a larger gauge of 18 in (457 mm).

== Locomotive ==
The 4-6-0 ten-wheeler steam locomotive of this railway was constructed by H. M. Leach of the Central Iron Works under Coit's supervision. It required four months for the five men who worked on it to complete the locomotive. The combined length of the locomotive and the tender was 16 feet (4,877 mm). The height was 52 inches (1,321 mm) from the top of the rail to the top of the stack.

The locomotive had six driving wheels with a diameter of 18 1/4 inches (464 mm) and four smaller leading wheels in a bogie. The Vanderbilt type boiler had a maximum pressure of 200 psi (13.8 bar; 1,379.0 kPa). It had 73 pieces of 1/2-inch (12.7 mm) diameter flues, which were 41 inches (1,041 mm) long. The complete train was equipped with a Westinghouse straight air brake.

== See also ==
- Billy Jones Wildcat Railroad
- Eastlake Park Scenic Railway
- Seaside Park Railway
- Venice Miniature Railway
- Urbita Lake Railway
