= Urbita Hot Springs =

Geothermal site in California

- Midway Springs; Pickering Park
- Lagoon at the Urbita Hot Springs in San Bernardino c. 1900 (CHS-11903 via USC Digital Library)
- Interactive map of Urbita Hot Springs
- Coordinates: 34.084°N 117.294°W
- Type: Geothermal
- Discharge: 760 liters/minute
- Temperature: 41 °C (106 °F)

Urbita Hot Springs was a historic hot springs and amusement park in San Bernardino County, California, United States. Urbita Springs Park was located between E Street and Colton Street in San Bernardino where the Inland Center mall stands today.

== History ==
Urbita Springs were used by indigenous people of the area. Used for recreation by settlers as early as the 1880s, the site was first known as Midway Springs, as they stood midway between San Bernardino and Colton. Willows and cottonwoods (likely native) grew around the lake, and other ferns and flowers were later delivered by train and added to the landscape. The name Urbita means "little city" and applied first to a nearby development established in 1899. In 1905 there was an Urbita School located at H Street and Adell Street in San Bernardino.

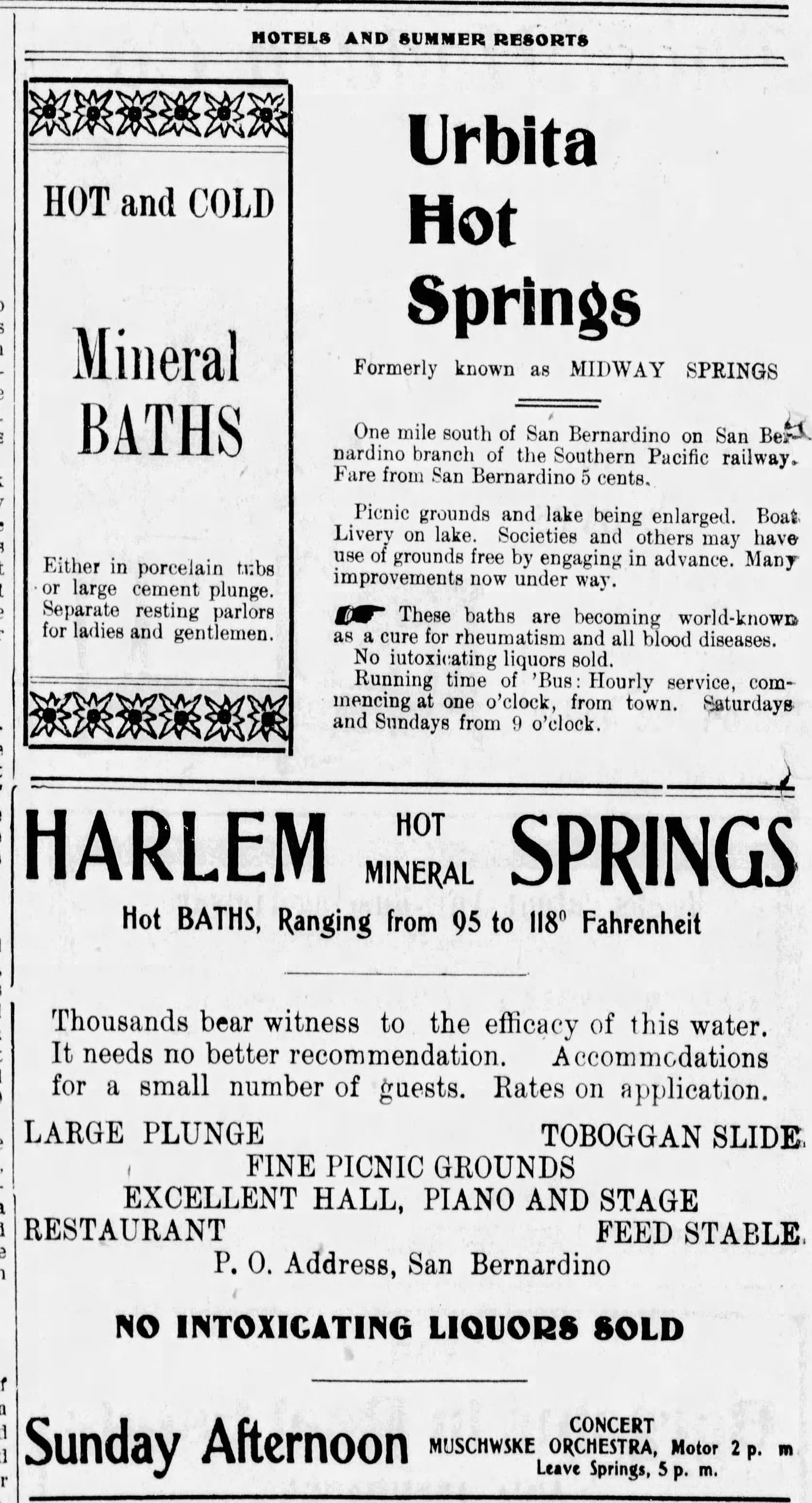
Daily Times-Index, San Bernardino, August 5, 1901

Urbita was one of several hot springs in San Bernardino County, including Arrowhead Hot Springs, Harlem Hot Springs, and Rabel Hot Springs, which were first developed as resorts in the 1880s. The San Bernardino Valley Traction Co. ran a trolley line out to the springs, and a separate (but associated) company developed the bathhouse and surrounding parkland. The lake may have been created or significantly expanded on the "low land to the south of the present bathhouse" in 1901 when the site was purchased by A. C. Denman Jr.

Urbita Springs was ultimately developed into a 15-acre (6.1 ha; 650,000 ft^{2}) amusement park oriented toward working-class families. Nearby there was the Association Park racetrack, football fields, and a baseball diamond. In early days it featured sulphured water baths, rowboating on the lake, a carousel, and a small zoo. The dance hall and the plunge swimming pool were both 50 ft by 100 ft, there were 100 changing rooms, and 40 porcelain soaking tubs. The Urbita Zoo had snakes, llamas, and raccoons. Hot-air ballooning was attempted in 1911. Urbita Springs hosted the National Orange Show convention in 1918.

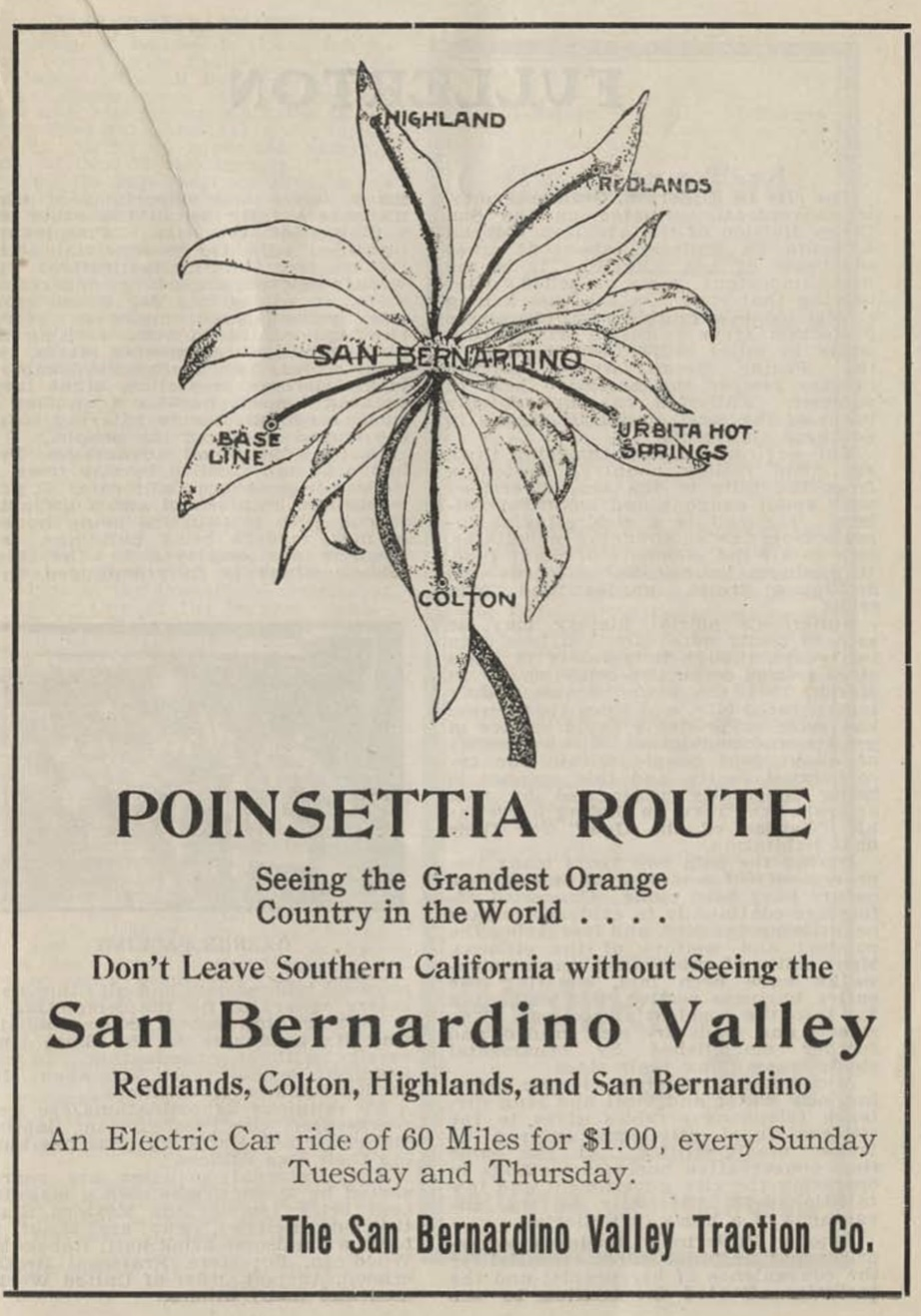
The springs were first developed by the San Bernardino Valley Traction Co. and were a featured attraction on their Poinsettia route.

Operated for a time by the Pacific Electric streetcar company, and home to the Urbita Lake Railway, the site was renamed Pickering Park in 1924. Pickering Park shut down in 1939 due to a combination of the financial crisis of the Great Depression and a drought that depleted groundwater and dried up the park's signature lake. The Urbita Springs Ballroom survived into the 1950s. In the 1940s and 1950s, surrounding wetlands and water features also dried up and the land was subdivided for retail and residential use.

By 1960 the park was described as overgrown, abandoned, "desolate" and littered with discarded beer cans. In 1966 what had once been Urbita Springs Park became the site of Inland Shopping Center. In the 1980s, after "a succession of unusually wet winters and intentional replenishing of the water supply overloaded the underground basin," springs and underground water began emerging in places in San Bernardino where it was unexpected and unwanted, including in basements, movie theaters, and in an elevator shaft at San Bernardino City Hall. Outdoors, cattails began to grow in low places on undeveloped land.

== Water profile ==
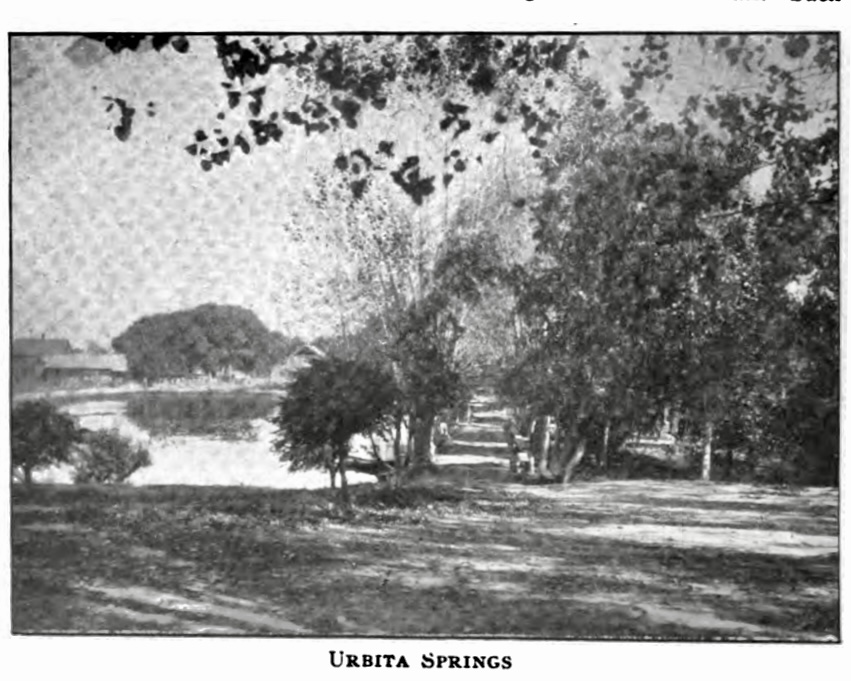
Urbita Springs pictured in Out West magazine, 1908

The hot water was believed to come from 600 feet (180 m) below ground. According to an U.S. government survey of California springs first published in 1915, "About 1 mile south of San Bernardino a recreation park known as Urbita Hot Springs has been built about a group of artesian wells that yield thermal water. This water supplies a swimming plunge, tub baths, and a small lake. The warmest well yields about 200 US gallons (760 L; 170 imp gal) a minute of mildly sulphureted water that is said to have a temperature of 106 °F (41 °C). The following partial analysis shows that, like the water at Arrowhead and at Harlem springs, it is not highly mineralized, but small amounts of sulphur and iron constituents in the water cause it to stain the enameled bathtubs." The thermal springs in the area were associated with a tectonic fault at the base of the San Bernardino Mountains.

== Additional images ==
Urbita Springs
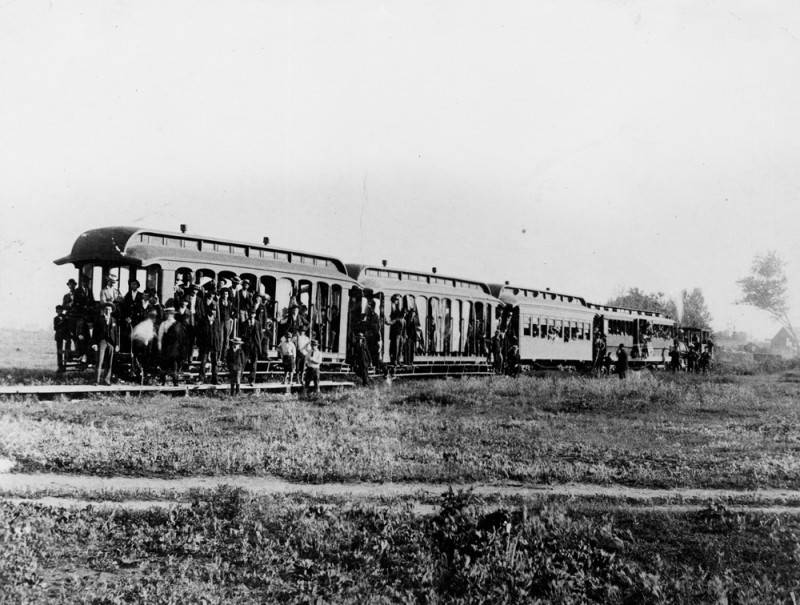
Group photo of passengers on the first train in the city which connected with Urbita Springs (LAPL 00032341, Works Progress Administration Collection)

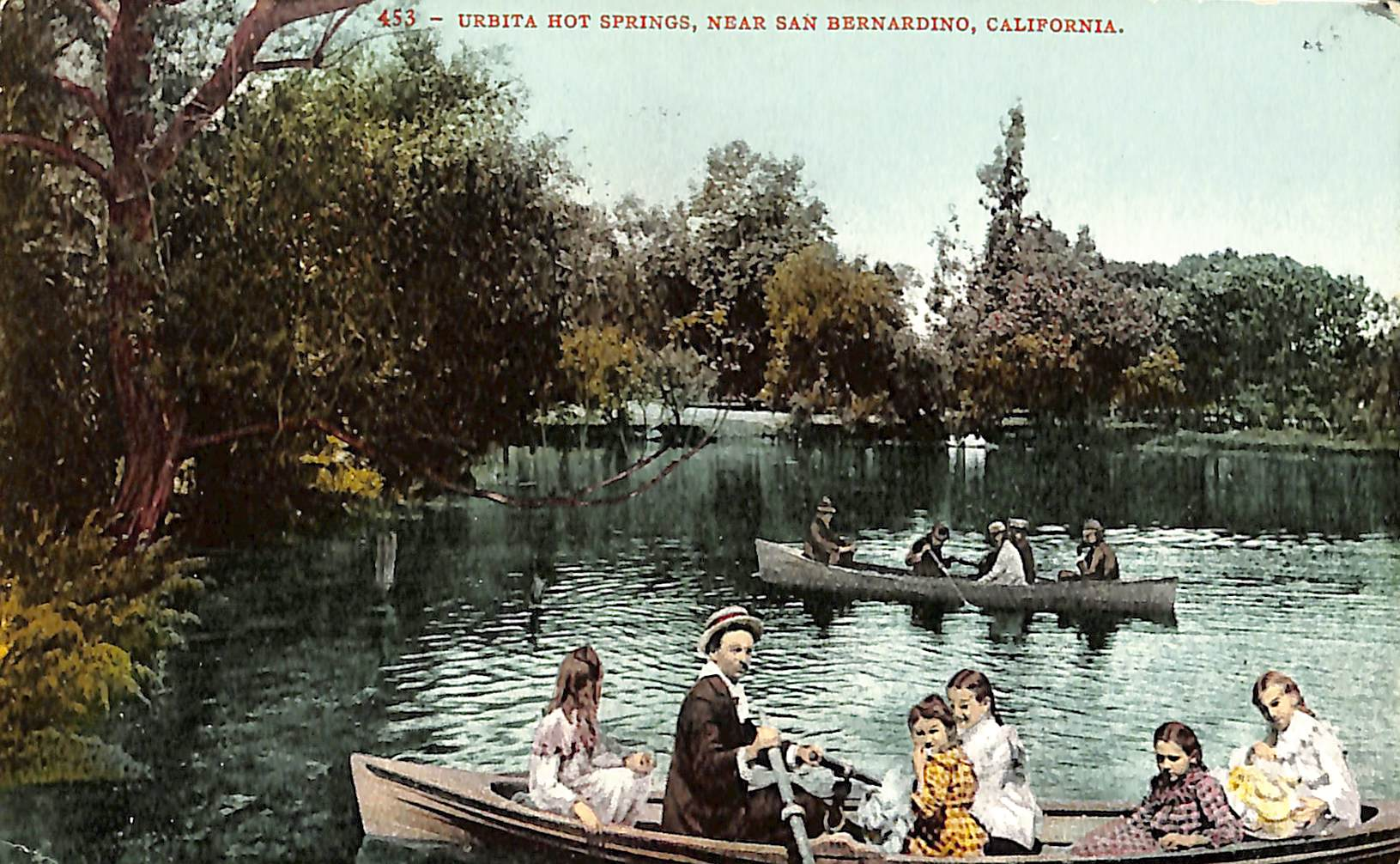
Urbita Hot Springs near San Bernardino, California (University of Texas Medical Branch image collections)

== See also ==
- List of hot springs in the United States § California
- De Sienna Mission Hot Springs
- California Winter League feat. Urbita Stars
- Tilden Park Merry-Go-Round (originally located at Urbita)
- Redlands Line
