= Ventura County Fair =

Annual event in Ventura, California, U.S.

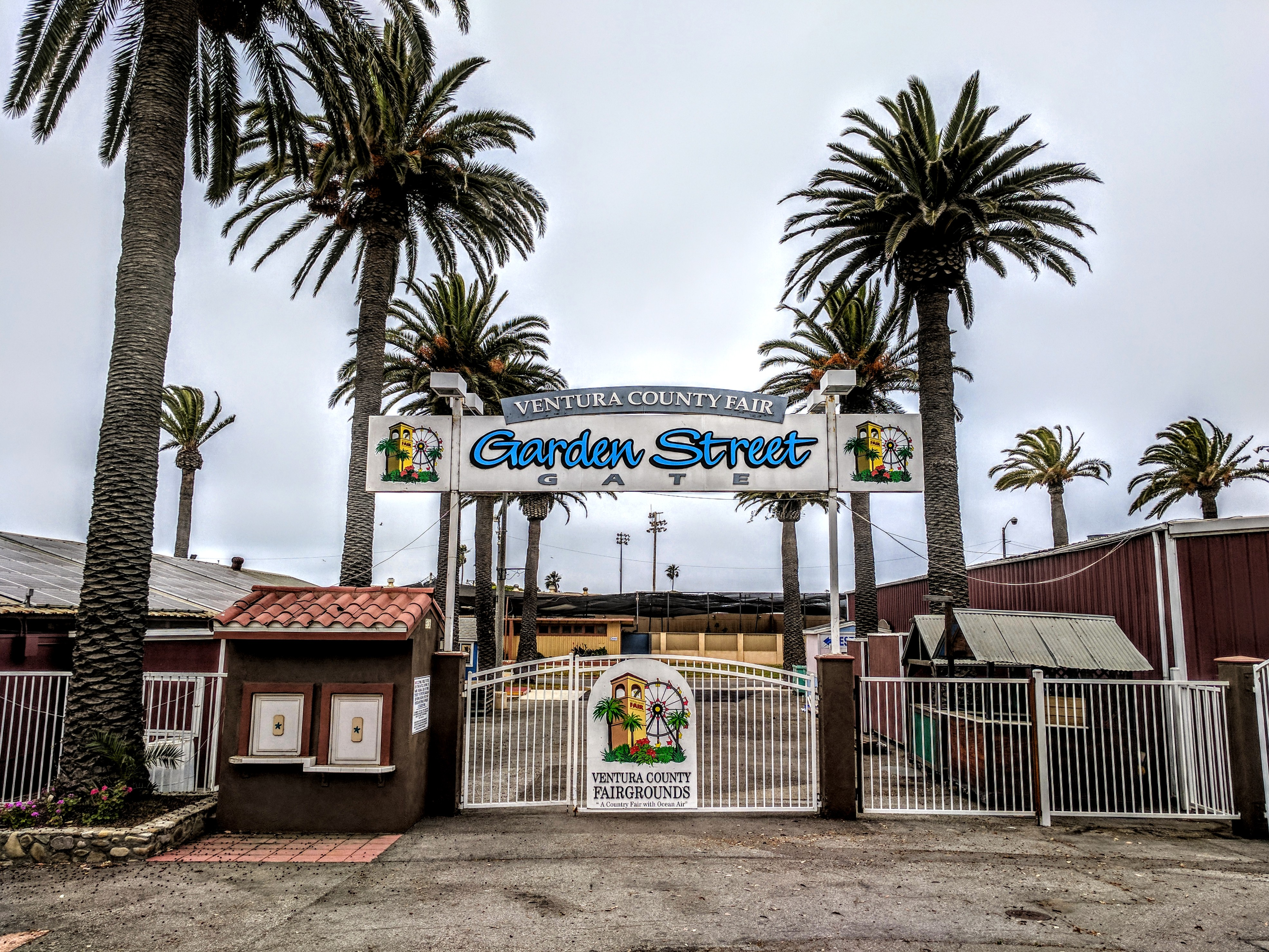
- Garden Street gate
- Status: active
- Genre: Agricultural show
- Frequency: Annually
- Venue: Seaside Park
- Location: California
- Coordinates: 34°16′34″N 119°18′3″W
- Country: United States
- Years active: 151
- Established: 1875
- Previous event: July 30 to August 10, 2025
- Next event: July 29 to August 9, 2026
- Attendance: 333,000 (2023)
- Area: 63 acres (25 ha)
- Website: www.venturacountyfair.org

The Ventura County Fair is an annual event held each August in Ventura, California, United States, at Seaside Park, commonly called the Ventura County Fairgrounds. The fair includes an agricultural show, carnival rides, food booths, and nightly concerts.

== History ==
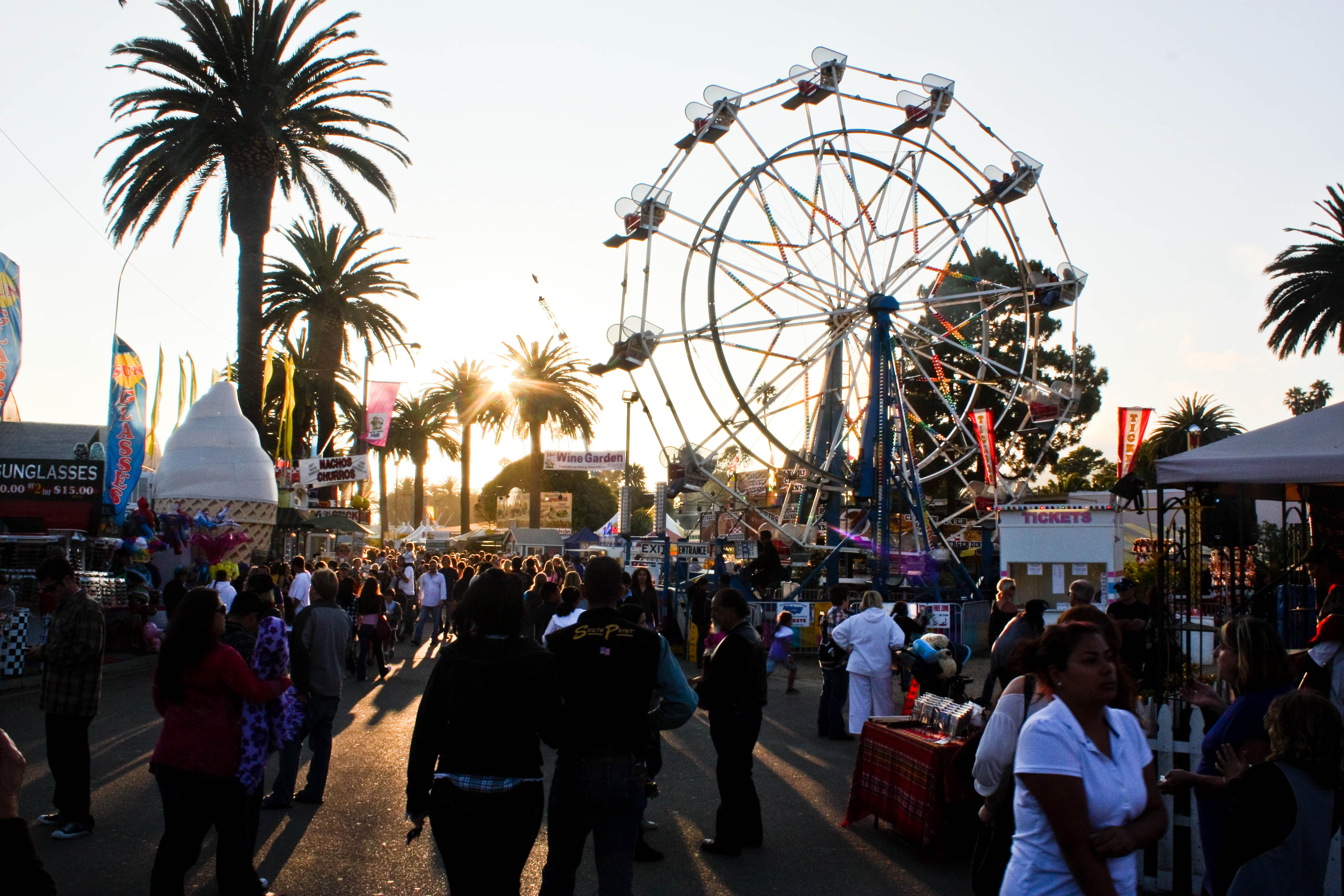
Ventura County Fair

The first Ventura County Fair took place in 1874 at the end of the local San Miguel Days harvest festival with attractions that included cockfighting, bullfighting and horse racing, as well as nightly balls. From 1877, it was held at Pierpont Bluffs until 1891, when it was moved to Port Hueneme. The Seaside Park property that includes the Ventura County Fairgrounds was donated to the county in 1909 by E. P. Foster, and the fair began to be held there in 1914.

The fair was formerly held at the beginning of October, reflecting its focus on agriculture. In 1987, the event was moved to August to boost attendance by taking advantage of better weather.

The fair attracts more than 300,000 visitors each year. The County Fair parade was held on the nearby Main Street in downtown near the opening day for many years, but the parade is no longer held due to budget concerns.

During the fair, Ventura City police provide 24-hour security. The Ventura County Sheriff's Office Mounted Enforcement Unit assists with horseback deputies.

No fair was held in 1917–18 because of World War I, 1942–45 because of World War II, and 2020–21 due to the COVID-19 pandemic.

== Musical entertainment ==
Many notable artists and bands have played at the fair, including The Beach Boys, Jimi Hendrix Deep Purple, The B52’s, Smash Mouth, and Smokey Robinson.
