= Foster Park Bowl =

Outdoor amphitheatre

- Foster Park Bowl in disrepair, 25 July 2009
- Interactive map of Foster Park Bowl
- Address: 438 Casitas Vista Road; Ventura, California 93001
- Coordinates: 34.352336°N 119.310898°W
- Owner: Ventura County Parks Department
- Capacity: 1,000
- Type: Amphitheatre

Construction
- Built: 1928

The Foster Park Bowl is an outdoor amphitheatre located between Ojai and Ventura, California. Built in 1928, it has a seating capacity of 1,000.

== History ==
Ventura County pioneer and philanthropist Eugene Preston Foster initiated the idea of a county park system in 1904; the 205-acre (0.83 km^{2}) Foster Park was established in 1908. The concrete amphitheatre began construction in the summer of 1928 and was dedicated on November 26, 1928.

The bowl was used frequently into the 1960s, but in the 1970s it saw less use as people started to shift to Libbey Bowl in Ojai. The bowl was occasionally used after the 1970s but fell into disrepair. An attempt to renovate Foster Park Bowl was mounted in 1988 by the Ventura County Repertory Theatre.

As of 2009, Teenagers for The Preservation of Historical Landmarks, a student group based at Foothill Technology High School, are working to get the necessary permits and release forms in order to go to the bowl and do an initial cleanup. The group is planning various fundraisers to pay for the stage to be reinforced, which a 2007 assessment stated would require $30,000 worth of work.

== See also ==
- Ventura County Historic Landmarks & Points of Interest
