= Venice Miniature Railway =

Coordinates: 33.989077°N 118.463186°W

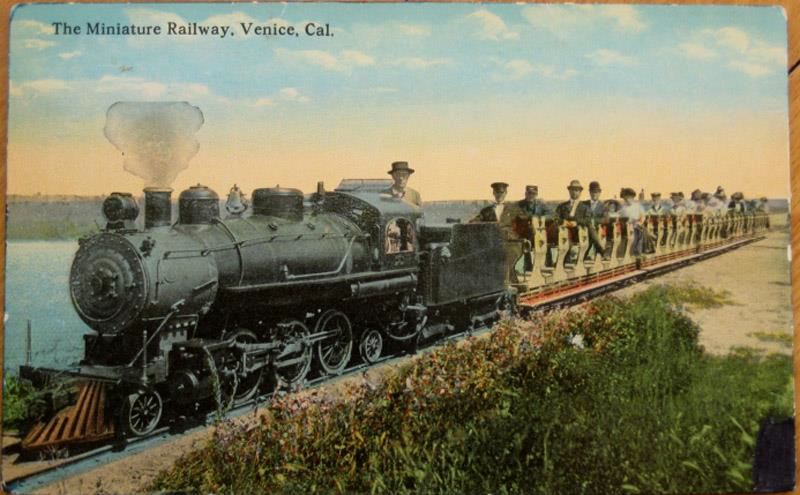
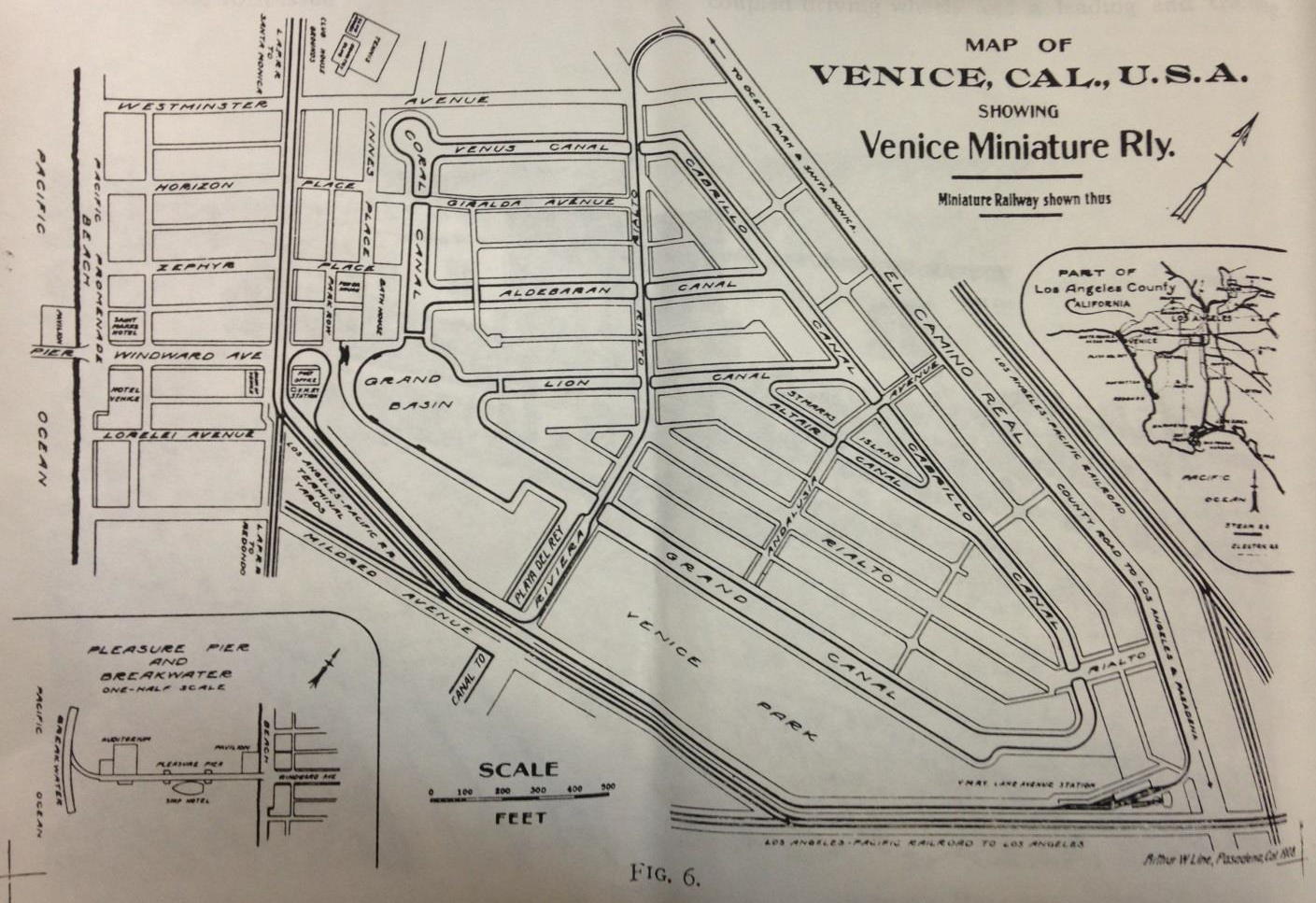
- Steam loco No 2 of the Venice Miniature Railway Map of the track, 1909

Technical
- Line length: 7,500 feet (2,300 m)
- Track gauge: 18 in (457 mm)
- Maximum incline: Lion Canal Bridge: 11 %

The Venice Miniature Railway was a 7,500-foot (2,300 m) long miniature railway in the 1:3 scale with a gauge of 18 in (457 mm), which was in operation from July 30, 1905, to February 13, 1925, in Venice near Los Angeles in California.

== Location ==
Trips on the loop track started at the locomotive shed at the corner of Lake Avenue and El Camino Real (now Venice Boulevard and Abbot Kinney Boulevard) in a clockwise direction along Mildred Avenue towards the Business District. There the trains looped around the Post Office and again followed Mildred Avenue, until they crossed several canals on Riviera and Rialto. Finally, they turned sharply onto Washington Boulevard. They used El Camino Real to get back to the Lake Avenue Station and the locomotive shed.

== Cost ==
The cost of a trip around Venice was five cents. Regular users could buy a book of tickets for $1.00, which reduced the cost to only two cents per trip. At the same time, a one-way ride from Los Angeles to Venice on the Los Angeles Pacific Railway cost 15 cents.

== History ==
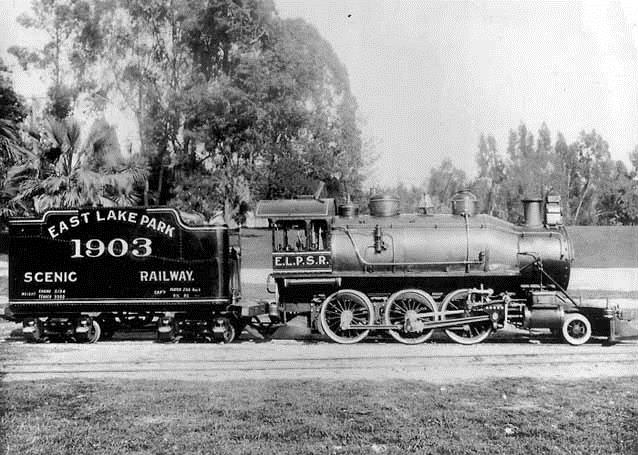
The small 3-Spot loco No 1903, which had previously been used on the ELPSR

Abbot Kinney, who had designed plans for Venice of America, contracted John J. Coit to build a miniature railway in Venice Beach near Los Angeles. Coit had worked as a master machinist at the Johnson Machine Works and had already built and operated the Eastlake Park Scenic Railway with a gauge of 18 in (457 mm) in Eastlake Park (now Lincoln Park).

John J. Coit owned the oil-fired steam locomotive No. 1903 of the 2-6-0 type with an overall length above the couplings of 19 feet (5.8 m). This locomotive made use of some technical innovations such as controlling the valves without an eccentric, which made it easier to adjust and maintain them. It had been successfully used on the Eastlake Park Scenic Railway, but at 8,000 lb (3,629 kg) lacked the weight and power for the planned activity at Venice. Therefore, Coit ordered a 9,260 lb (4,200 kg) oil-fired steam locomotive of the 2-6-2 (“Prairie”) type at his former employer, the Johnson Machine Works, into which his innovations had to be integrated.

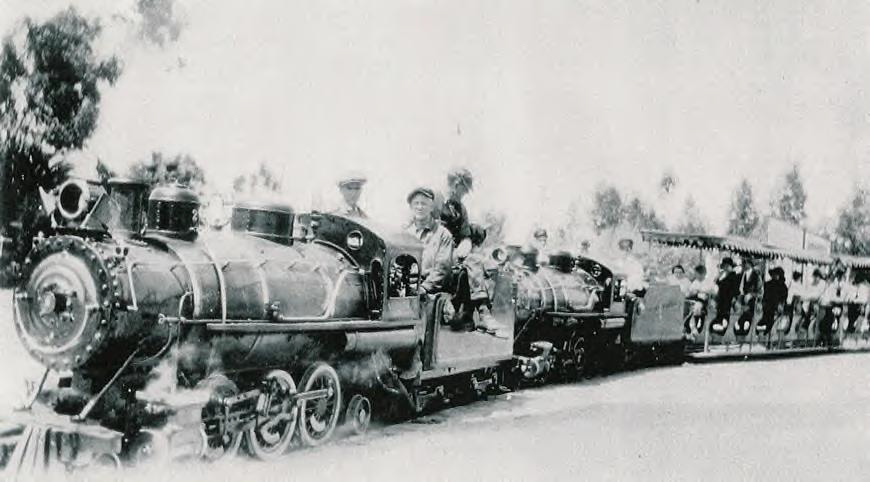
Double traction with steam locos No. 2 (front) and No. 1 (behind)

The new, nearly-identical steam locomotives No. 1 and No. 2 were called 1-Spot and 2-Spot. After Coit had issued the engineering drawings, he contracted the Johnson Machine Works for the manufacture. The boilers were made and supplied by the Pacific Coast Boiler Works in Los Angeles and were fit for a pressure of 175 psi (1.21 MPa; 12.1 bar). The locomotives had a Walschaerts valve gear and cost $4,510 (equivalent to $161,608 in 2025) each. They were painted in black with polished brass bands and silver lettering. The only difference between them was the shape of the windows of their cabs: 1-Spot had rectangular windows with rounded corners at the top and the upper part of 2-Spot's windows was crescent-shaped. The maximum speed was 30 mph (50 km/h).

The railway used ten passenger coaches in an elaborate Venetian style with lion's head ornaments on their sides, which had been supplied by the J.G. McLain Company for $400 (equivalent to $14,333 in 2025) each. Five of them were painted in royal blue while the remainder were painted in cherry red. Each of them had twelve seats, and they were typically assembled to unicoloured trains.

=== Disagreements ===
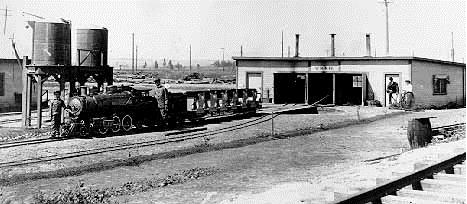
Turn table, water tower and oil tank in front of the locomotive shed at the corner of Lake Avenue and El Camino Real

After a good start there was an increasing animosity between Kinney and Coit. Kinney insisted on his two very young sons being involved in the rail road. The eight-year-old Carleton was nominated as VMR President (at the time he was lauded as being the youngest railroad president in the world) and the twelve-year-old Innes as Chief Engineer, which dishonored Coit's actual position. When Kinney wanted to get more control over the day-to-day business in Venice, he tried in 1906 to take over the railway from Coit, although they had both signed a five-year contract. He forced the railway to close down for six months during the summer, allegedly because one of the wooden bridges needed to be replaced by a concrete structure.

In November 1906 Kinney tried to take over the railway while Coit was out of town. On Coit's return, Coit removed some armatures and other essential parts from the locomotives before Coit went away on another trip. Because Kinney could not get these parts machined without drawings, he could not operate the railway for the remainder of that year. He sued Coit, and it came to a court case that was decided on November 20, 1906, at the Los Angeles County Court. Coit and his colleagues were deemed not guilty regarding the claims of vandalism and theft, but Kinney started civil proceedings against Coit, in which Kinney convinced an artitrator to make a decision in his favour on January 19, 1907. Thus Coit had to reinstall the missing parts and reimburse the cost. Subsequently, the railway was recommissioned. Coit left the company and did not get reinvolved with its business. Coit was killed in a railway accident on September 21, 1910, while helping to build the Panama Canal. The railway was regularly used for another 18 years until the early 1920s, when it lost its attraction due to increasing auto traffic. It was even seen as a nuisance by locals and visitors.

=== Accidents and incidents ===
The first accident on the railway occurred on June 3, 1910. Locomotive No. 2 had just been through a refurbishment and chief engineer W.J. Markham was "trying her out" that morning before regular operations. After cresting a bridge the locomotive, which was running light (not pulling any passenger cars) at the time, collided with a grocer's wagon, causing the wagon to crash onto its horse. The wagon was parked on the track because its operator was familiar with the area and had concluded that the railway doesn't normally run in the morning. The wreckage was cleared and the locomotive was deemed operable enough to be used for its regular use later that day. Later in the same month, on June 30, the last car of the train was struck by a car in a hit and run accident in which only minor injuries were sustained. The driver of the car was deemed at fault and agreed to pay for repairs.

=== Closure and preservation ===
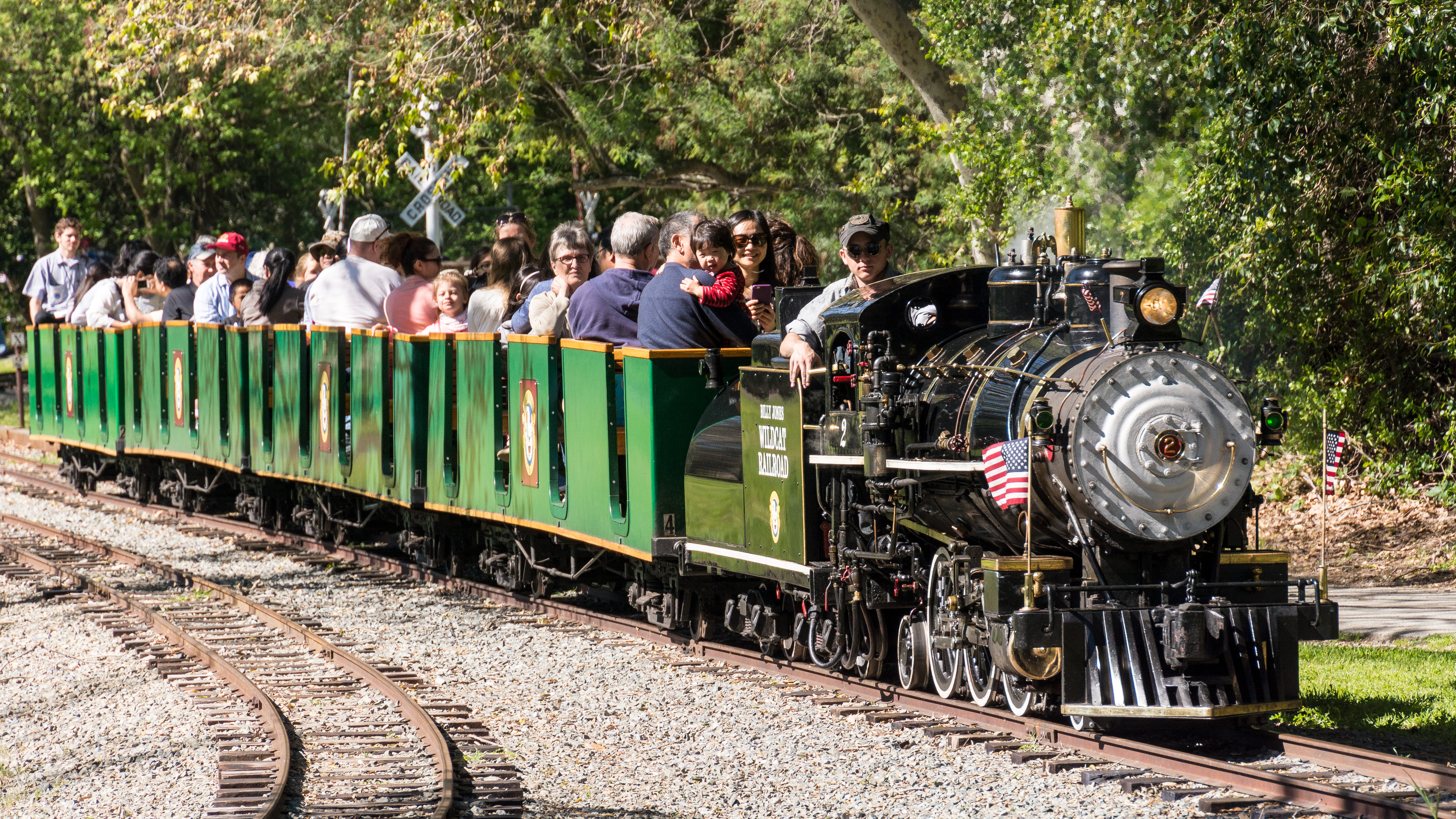
2-Spot steam loco No. 2 of the Billy Jones Wildcat Railroad

When Kinney died in November 1920, his adopted son Thornton Parillo continued to operate the railway. It was taken out of service on February 23, 1925, when an order had been issued which prohibited its further use. The railway's ceremonial final run was in May 1925, just before local residents teamed up to volunteer in an "old-fashioned bee" to remove the tracks because there was no provision made by law to manage the expense of the line's removal.

The 1-Spot was acquired from a scrap heap in Vernon by Al Smith (not the Orchard Supply Hardware executive who supported the Billy Jones Wildcat Railroad and Swanton Pacific). He reconditioned it and used it well into the 1950s in San Gabriel and Pico Rivera. After his death it was sold to Don McCoy who overhauled it together with his sons and used it from 1972 to 1978 at the Whittier Narrows Recreational Area. Since the closure of this railway, it is kept in the private collection of the McCoy family in southern California.

The 2-Spot was, by chance, found and rescued, at the last hour before its planned export to be scrapped in Japan, by Billy Jones, who purchased it, reconditioned it, and used it on Sundays to entertain the neighbors’ children on his ranch. It is now regularly used at the Billy Jones Wildcat Railroad in Los Gatos, California.

== Movies ==
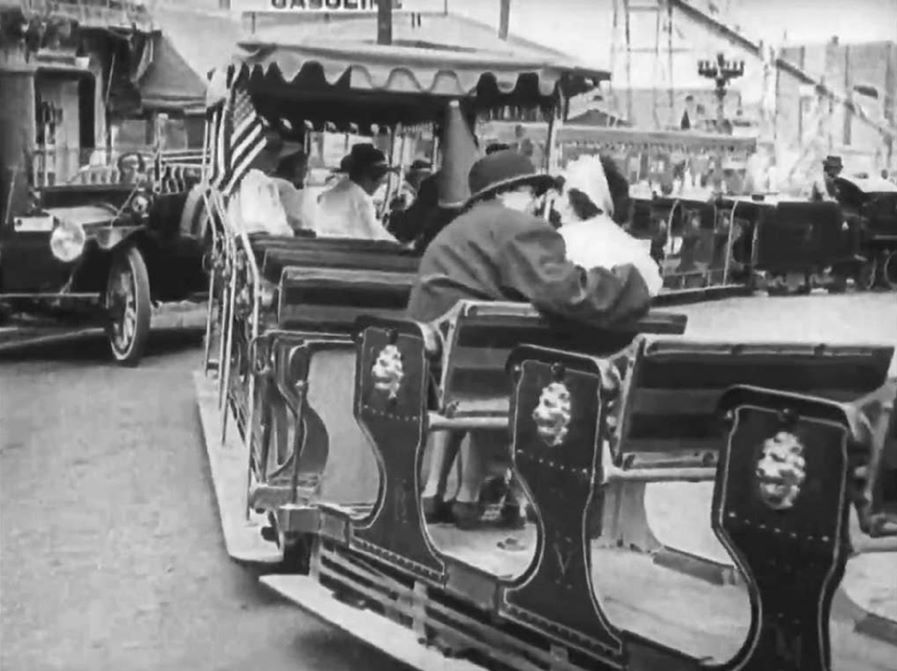
Harold Lloyd: 'By the Sad Sea Waves'

In Harold Lloyd's 1917 movie By the Sad Sea Waves his character pretends to be a beach lifeguard in order to be more attractive to the ladies. The movie concludes when Harold and his newest conquest Bebe Daniels ride off into the sunset aboard the Venice Miniature Railway. In his movie Number, Please? of 1920 he is less lucky, as he loses the girl, and rides off on the train all by himself.

The Century Comedy Kids run the train on behalf of their sick father in the silent movie Speed Boys, which was released in Holland as The New Engine Driver. Other Keystone Kid Pictures productions were also filmed on the railway.

Harold Lloyd: 'By the Sad Sea Waves' (Full movie)

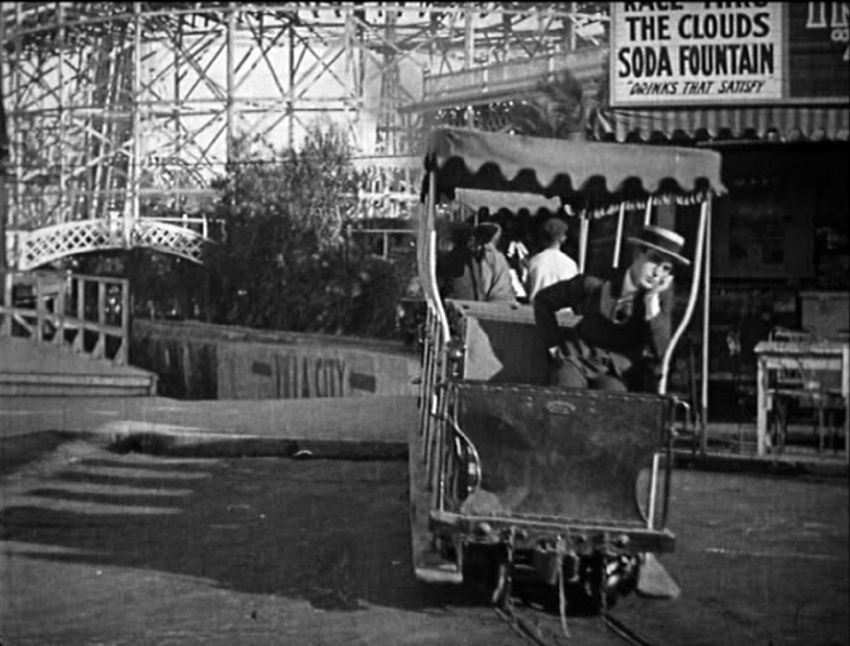
Harold Lloyd: 'Number please?' (Screen shot)

Harold Lloyd: 'Number please?' (Full movie)

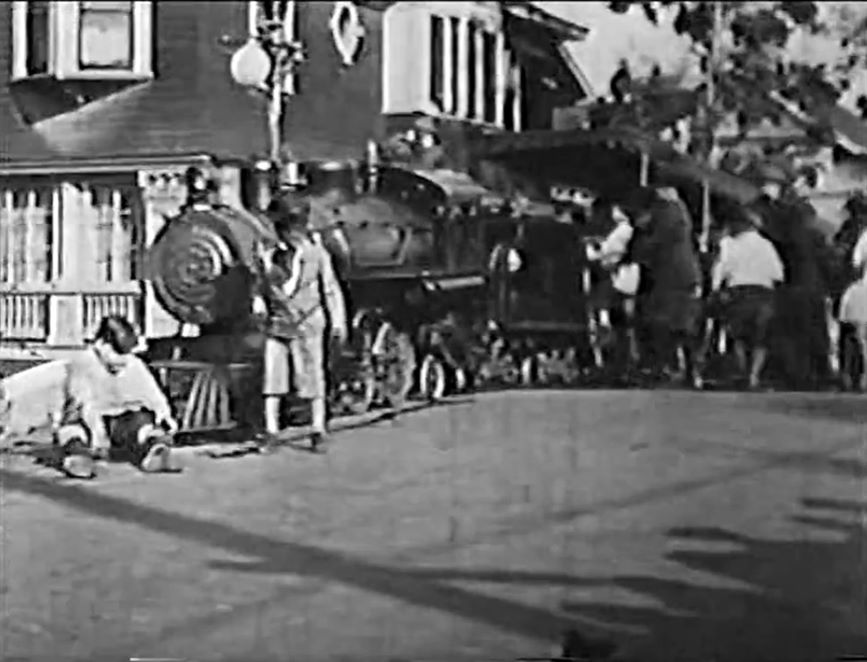
The Century Comedy Kids in 'Speed Boys' or 'The New Engine Driver'

== Photographs ==
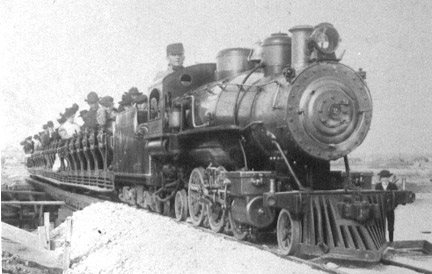
John J. Coit engineers the No. 2 over a canal bridge

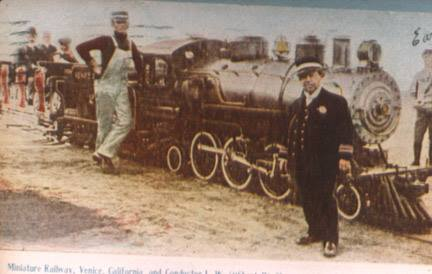
John J. Coit stands left of loco No. 2

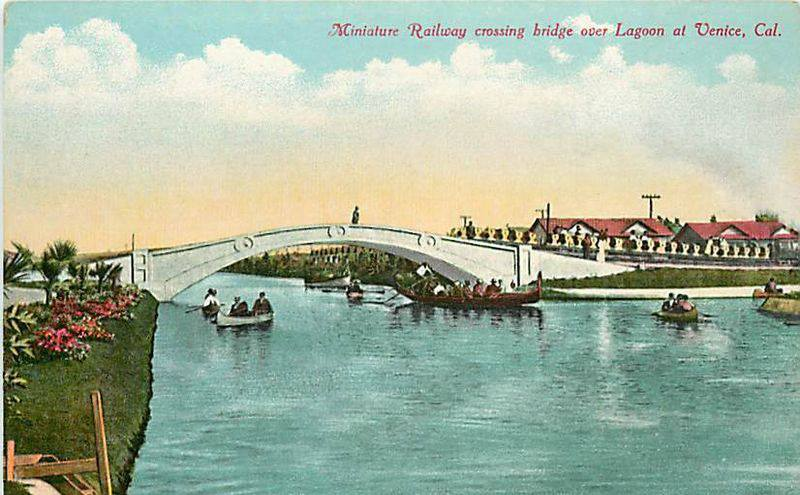
"Miniature Railway crossing bridge over Lagoon at Venice, Cal."

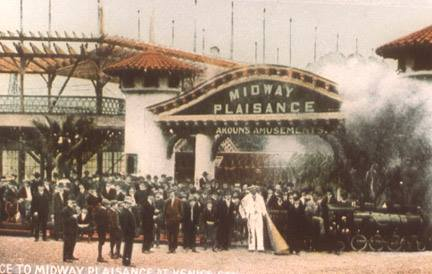
The Miniature Railway at Midway Plaisance in Venice

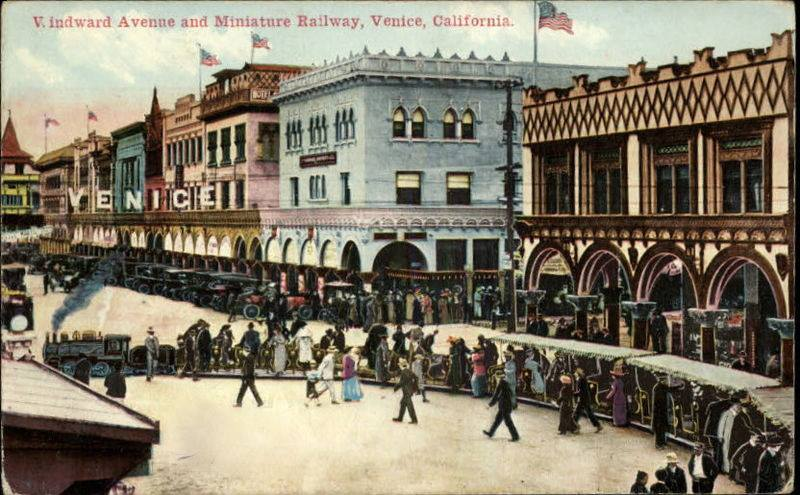
"Windward Avenue and Miniature Railway, Venice, California"

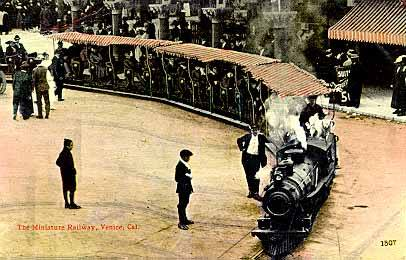
Loco No 2 at the Windward Avenue Loop around the Post Office

== See also ==
- Billy Jones Wildcat Railroad
- Eastlake Park Scenic Railway
- Long Beach and Asbury Park Railway
- Seaside Park Railway
- Urbita Lake Railway
