= Inland Center =

- Location: San Bernardino, California, United States
- Coordinates: 34.08494°N 117.29746°W
- Opened: 1966
- Developer: Homart Development Company
- Manager: Macerich
- Owner: Macerich
- Architect: Victor Gruen Associates
- Num. of stores: 110
- Num. of anchor tenants: 4 (2 open, 2 vacant)
- Floor area: 988,535 sq ft (91,837.9 m^{2}) (GLA)
- Floors: 1 (2 in JCPenney, Macy’s and former Sears, 3 and a penthouse in former Forever 21, 3rd floor and penthouse unused from The Broadway)
- Website: inlandcenter.com

Inland Center is a regional shopping mall owned and operated by Macerich, located in San Bernardino, California along the southwest border adjacent to Interstate 215 and the city of Colton. The mall is within one mile of three bordering cities on the southern end of San Bernardino (Redlands, Colton, and Loma Linda). Inland Center is a single-level mall anchored by JCPenney and Macy's plus 110 specialty shops and services.

== History ==
=== Construction and grand opening ===
Originally constructed by Homart Development Company and opened in 1966, Inland Center Mall was built on top of the former Urbita Hot Springs lake. Victor Gruen Associates of Beverly Hills designed the center.

Three major department stores anchored the mall at or close to its opening date:

- The Broadway opened August 29, 1966, 3 selling floors, 158,000 square feet (14,700 m^{2}). Charles Luckman and Associates, architects. Its exterior was featured white pillars, as well as Portuguese marble in brown and champagne tones. It had interior murals by Charles Riggs, Ben Morris, Roy Little, Paul Sherman, and Ray Jacobs.
- May Company opened September 6, 1966, three levels, 200,000 square feet (19,000 m^{2})
- Sears opened September 28, 1966, 2 levels, 264,000 square feet (24,500 m^{2}) plus an automotive center in an outbuilding

The mall courcourse with approximately 70 stores, opened October 12, 1966. There was parking for 5,000 cars. The total lots size was 63 acres (25 ha).

=== 1990s ===
The mall experienced a number of changes in the 1990s. In January 1993, the May Company store closed due to the chain merging with Robinson's to become Robinsons-May leaving the mall with only two anchors, The Broadway and Sears, which reduced overall traffic after merging with May Department Stores. In 1995, Gottschalks moved into the old May Co building. A year later, Macy's bought out The Broadway, and converted its three-story building to a Macy's location. In 1998, a fourth anchor building was annexed in front of the mall's main entrance, along with a four-story parking structure. The store was Robinsons-May, returning to the mall after a five-year hiatus from doing business in San Bernardino since May Company's closure.

=== 2000s ===
In 2000, the main entrances were renovated placing trees and benches at all entrances and a new mall sign along with a new remodeled Food Court next to Sears, where the old Miller's Outpost was located. In 2006, Macy's bought out Robinsons-May, and since having two anchors on the same property was redundant, decided to close the old Broadway building in favor of the more modern built Robinsons-May building at its current location.

The vacant Broadway building was sold to Mervyn's in 2007 for renovation and a proposed opening in September 2008, but the Mervyn's company was liquidated around that time after filing for Chapter 7. Also in October 2008, construction was made to seal off the vacant and smaller second level of the mall to public traffic. In 2009, Forever 21 announced it would move into the vacant building that was partially renovated by Mervyn's. Gottschalks closed its doors in July 2009 after they too filed for Chapter 11 liquidation. J. C. Penney announced that they would open at the former Gottschalks building.

=== 2010s ===
In 2013, Macerich Corporation installed over 4,000 solar panels on the corridor rooftops to reduce their dependence on electricity during operating hours. EV Charging Stations were also installed in the parking lots at the major entrances. In 2015, Sears Holdings spun off 235 of its properties, including the Sears at Inland Center, into Seritage Growth Properties. In 2016, JCPenney opened a store in the former Gottschalks building.

In summer 2018, it was announced that fashion retailer H&M would be opening a 20,000 square foot location inside the mall. The store opened later in fall 2018.

On October 1, 2019, it was announced that Forever 21 would be closing as part of a plan to close 178 stores nationwide. However, there have been conflicting reports of this location closing, and as of June 2020, the store has remained open.

On November 7, 2019, it was announced that Sears would be closing as part of a plan to close 96 stores nationwide. The store closed on February 2, 2020.

=== 2020s ===
On June 4, 2020, it was announced that JCPenney would be closing as part of a plan to close 154 stores nationwide. However, as of August 2020, this store has been removed from the closing list and will stay open for now. On March 21, 2025, it was announced that Forever 21 will be closing again as part of a plan to close all locations in the United States, which will leave JCPenney and Macy's as the mall's remaining anchors.

Sometime in April 2025 Forever 21 closed.

In October 2025, Spirit Halloween was opened for the whole month until it closed a few days after Halloween, leaving it Vacant Again.

On April 24, 2026, Urban Planet will be opened at the inland center and will be located at the former Forever 21 Building.

== Structural features ==
In 2006, the original Macy's store which occupied a dated The Broadway location was closed and the more modern 165,000 sq ft (15,300 m^{2}) Robinsons-May was converted to Macy's as part of the Federated Department Stores merger with May Department Stores. Mervyn's was to take over the old 94,011 sq ft (8,733.9 m^{2}) anchor space but failed to open after their bankruptcy finalized in 2009.

Construction was also completed in 2007 to seal off the lower level, demolishing a staircase and glass elevator that took customers to the lower level of the mall that remained vacant after Oshman's Sporting Goods and a video arcade closed down in prior decades. After construction was completed, the upper-level floor was made solid and a Children's Play Area themed after US Route 66 was built near the old staircase location.

In January 2008, parking lots adjacent to the parking structure and a small portion of the underutilized western parking areas of the mall were used in the recent SANBAG and Caltrans I-215 expansion project. The Inland Center Drive overpass reopened next to the mall in April 2010.

During 2009, two adjacent pads to Inland Center owned by Macerich corporation were razed and placed for sale: On North Mall Boulevard and E Street (Formerly a Citibank branch) and South Mall Boulevard and E Street (Formerly Buffalo Ranch Restaurant).

=== Mall layout ===
A distinctive feature of Inland Center is the large cement vault in the center of the mall serving as its main entrance prior to 1988. The vault today serves as the walkway between Macy's and Forever 21 with smaller-format stores along each side and a perpendicular main walkway with full-size inline stores crossing the vault to reach JCPenney and the former Sears.

== Anchors ==
=== Current anchors ===
- North Anchor: Vacant
- South Anchor: JCPenney (2016–present)
- West Anchor: Macy's (2006–present)
- East Anchor: Urban Planet (2026–present)

=== Former anchors ===
- May Company (original tenant) (1966–1993) - Replaced by Gottschalks in 1995.
- The Broadway (original tenant) (1966–1996) - Replaced by Macy's in 1996.
- Robinsons-May (1998–2006) - Replaced by Macy's in 2006.
- Macy's (first location) (1996–2006) - Replaced by Forever 21 in 2009.
- Gottschalks (1995–2009) - Replaced by JCPenney in 2016.
- Sears (original tenant) (1966–2020)
- Forever 21 (2009–2025) - Replaced by Urban Planet in 2026.

=== Canceled anchors ===
- Mervyn's was originally going to open at the former Broadway Building in 2007 but the company filed for Chapter 7 bankruptcy protection in the same year and would close all stores in 2009.
