= John J. Coit =

American railroad engineer

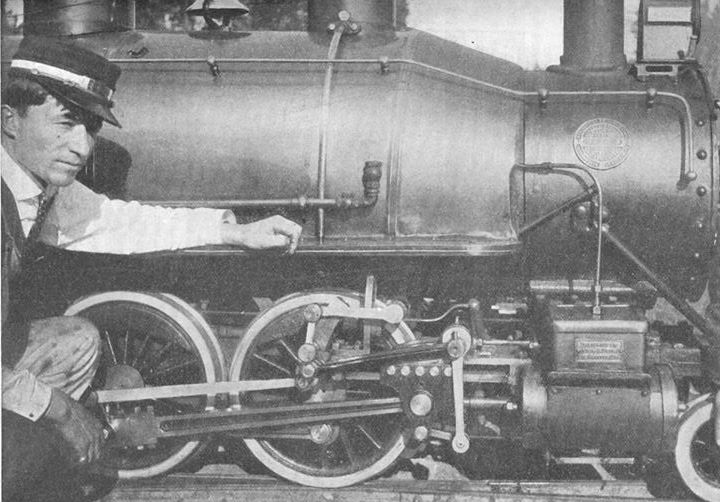
Coit shows his innovative and easily accessible valve control without eccentrics

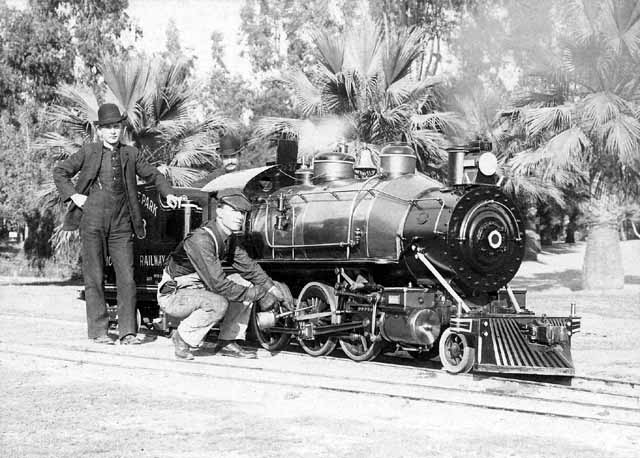
John J. Coit as machinist and his employee "Shorty" Chase as conductor with a bowler hat

John J. Coit (1875 – 21 September 1910) was an American experienced railroad engineer, who built and operated four miniature railways in California.

== Life and work ==
John J. Coit worked initially as a master machinist at the Johnson Machine Works but could not continue in this profession because he became physically handicapped. He built and operated several miniature railways in succession:

- Seaside Park Railway
- Long Beach and Asbury Park Railway
- Eastlake Park Scenic Railway
- Venice Miniature Railway

His oilfired steam locomotive No 1903 with a total length of 5.80 meters (19 ft 0 in) from tip of pilot to end of tank couple and a height of 1,295 millimetres (51 in) from the top of rail to the top of stack was of the 2-6-0 type Mogul. The locomotive had some technical innovations, such as a valve control without eccentrics, which was easy to adjust and to maintain. The locomotive had also automatic couplings and a bespoke oil burner, for which Coit filed a patent.

From July 1908 he worked as a locomotive engineer on the main line of the Panama Railroad, while the Panama Canal was being built. He was employed by the Atlantic Division, and his residence in the Canal Zone was at Culebra.

== Death ==
Coit died in an accident in the morning of 21 September 1910 at the age of 35, when the locomotive No 500, with which he pulled a work train, derailed on the main line of the Panama Canal Railway from Gatún to Culebra after colliding with a cow. The locomotive derailed approximately 60 m (197 feet) in front of bridge No 47 near Mamei and tipped over onto the adjacent track, which ran towards the south. Coit died immediately at the scene of the accident and his West Indian fireman was seriously injured. The tipped-over locomotive was removed from the tracks to allow other trains to pass.

As Coit was not married, his sister, C.J. Stanton, 418 Solano Avenue, Los Angeles, was the next of kin. Three of his miniature locomotives are known to survive today. Venice Railway No. 1 and Eastlake Park No. 1903 are with private owners, while Venice Railway No. 2 operates at the Billy Jones Wildcat Railroad in Los Gatos, California.

== Patents ==
- Trolley-pole controller. US 879034 A. 20 October 1906.
- Air-brake mechanism. US 850564 A. 15 November 1906.
