= Billy Jones (railroader) =

American businessman (1884–1968)

Coordinates: 37.2366681°N 122.0445818°W

William Jones (1884–1968), a seasoned veteran of the steam era who established the Wildcat Railroad in Los Gatos, California, was born the son of a teamster in the town of Ben Lomond, California.

Jones found employment as an engine wiper at the age of 13 with the 3 ft (914 mm) narrow gauge South Pacific Coast Railroad at Boulder Creek, California. At 17, Jones was promoted to fireman, and later became an engineer. The South Pacific Coast Railroad, which had been acquired by the Southern Pacific Railroad, was converted to a standard gauge road by 1909. Jones was among the first to work the first standard gauge portions of the line out of San Jose, ultimately advancing to the Coast Daylight run between San Francisco and San Luis Obispo. After World War II, he was in charge of the reassembly of the preserved locomotive Gov. Stanford for Stanford University; the locomotive is currently on display at the California State Railroad Museum in Sacramento.

Jones married Geraldine McGrady, the schoolteacher at Wright's Station, located south of Los Gatos. After settling down in Los Gatos on a 9-acre (3.6 ha) prune orchard known as "The Ranch", the Jones family grew to include two sons, Robert and Neal, and two daughters, Betty and Geraldine. The Ranch was located at the corner of Daves Avenue and the Santa Clara-Los Gatos Road (today's Winchester Boulevard).

== Billy Jones Wildcat Railroad ==
Billy Jones Wildcat Railroad
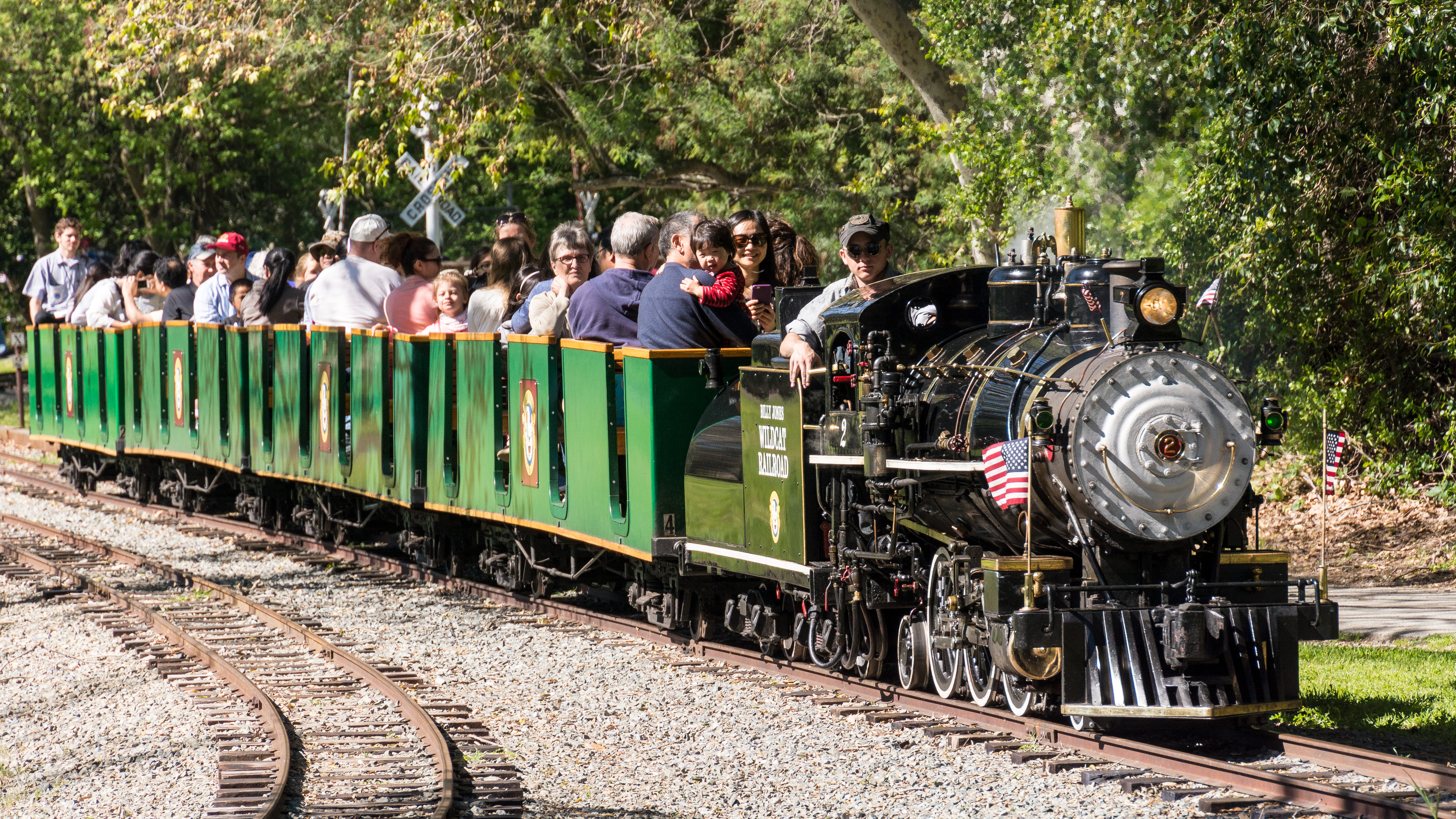
- Billy Jones Railroad in Vasona Lake Park

Overview
- Locale: Los Gatos, California
- Dates of operation: July 24, 1970–present
- Predecessor: Wildcat Railroad (1943-1968)

Technical
- Track gauge: 18 in (457 mm)

On the docks of San Francisco in 1939, Jones discovered an 18 in (457 mm) gauge steam locomotive built in 1905 and designed to run on the Venice Miniature Railway in Venice Beach, California. He bought the engine, nicknamed the 2-spot, for $100 (the engine was intended to be shipped to Japan for scrap metal; ironically, several hours after Jones bought the engine, the United States embargoed all steel exports to Japan) and got it running again on a miniature railway he and his railroad buddies constructed on the ranch, dubbed the "Wildcat Railroad".

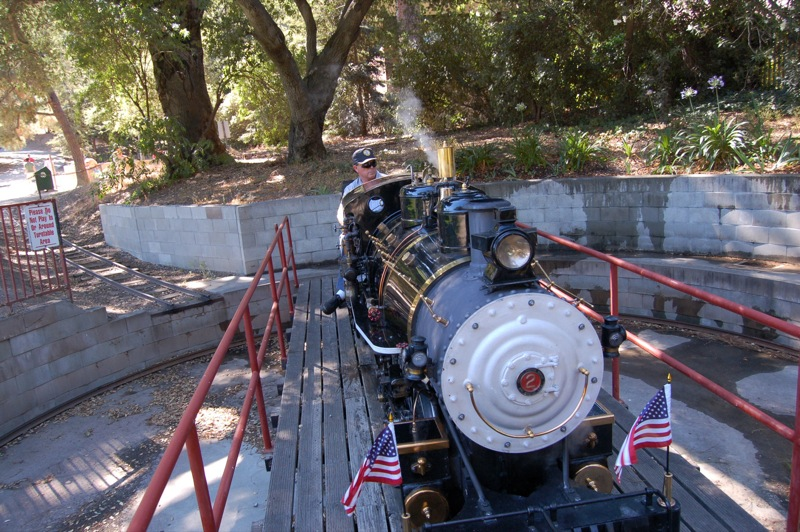
The 2-spot on the turn table

His only sons Robert and Neal were casualties of World War II, and Jones operated his "Wildcat Railroad" for the neighborhood children, every Sunday until his death in 1968 in memory of his two lost sons. The railroad attracted people from across the valley and beyond, including Walt Disney, who considered purchasing some of Jones' collection of miniature railway equipment, before deciding he wanted larger trains. The two became friends, and Jones was invited as an honorary engineer on Disney's 3 ft (914 mm) narrow gauge locomotives on opening weekend at Disneyland on July 17, 1955. In addition, animator Ward Kimball, who accompanied Disney on his first visit to the Wildcat, designed for Jones the first Wildcat Railroad passes, based on those from his own Grizzly Flats Railroad.

Jones retired from the Southern Pacific Company in 1949. In January 1959, it is said Jones ceremoniously ran the last train out of Los Gatos before the rails were taken up throughout the town.

Jones died of leukemia in 1968 at the age of 83, and his "Wildcat Railroad" was purchased by local residents who formed a non-profit organization to relocate and operate it at Oak Meadow Park and Vasona Park in Los Gatos (a plaque on a wall at the corner of Winchester and Daves marks the original location of the railroad). The railroad opened for regular operations on July 24, 1970 after nearly two years of restoration and construction, which included salvaging an 89-foot (27.13 m) Southern Pacific piggyback flatcar from a wreck and using it as a bridge over Los Gatos Creek, appropriately named Flatcar Bridge. In 1972, a one-and-a-half-mile (2.4 km) extension was built, adding a working grade with a 40-foot (12.19 m) trestle and bringing the railroad into Vasona Park, an extension built following complaints that the ride was too short; the original route simply went around Squirrel Hill (named so for its large squirrel population) and came back, the bridge over the creek being double-tracked so the train could run in both directions to even out the wear on the locomotive's wheels; after the extension, it remained double-tracked until the mid-1990s, when it was single-tracked, and fencing was added between the two pedestrian paths and the tracks; two sections of the mainline that parallel each other are the last remnant of the original route); there has been talk of extending the railroad around Vasona Lake, but this would require at least two grade crossings over county-owned roads, and several tunnels and bridges (including one in front of the Vasona Dam gates), and is unlikely to ever happen. By 1992, the railroad was averaging well over 100,000 riders each year.

It was also in 1992 that the railroad acquired its first diesel locomotive. Previously, the railroad had solely operated the steam locomotive that Billy had discovered in San Francisco in 1939. Realizing the need for a larger locomotive fleet, the railroad pursued options to acquire a more reliable diesel locomotive. Board member Albert B. "Al" Smith, a lifelong Los Gatan, former mayor, and the president of Orchard Supply Hardware, provided donations for a brand new diesel-hydraulic locomotive, constructed by Custom Locomotive Works in Chicago. and donated the locomotive to the railroad. Smith died a year later, and the diesel was, in later years, named for him, as was Santa Cruz, Big Trees and Pacific Railway CF7 #2600.

In 1994, the 2-spot was in need of a new boiler and complete overhaul. In the meantime, the new diesel, dubbed #2502 and painted in the Southern Pacific's Black Widow paint scheme, would serve as the primary locomotive of the railroad for eleven years. After a ten year restoration project, the 2-spot finally returned to service in July 2005. The occasion marked the 100th birthday of the steam locomotive and also celebrated the 35th anniversary of the Billy Jones Wildcat Railroad in Vasona Park

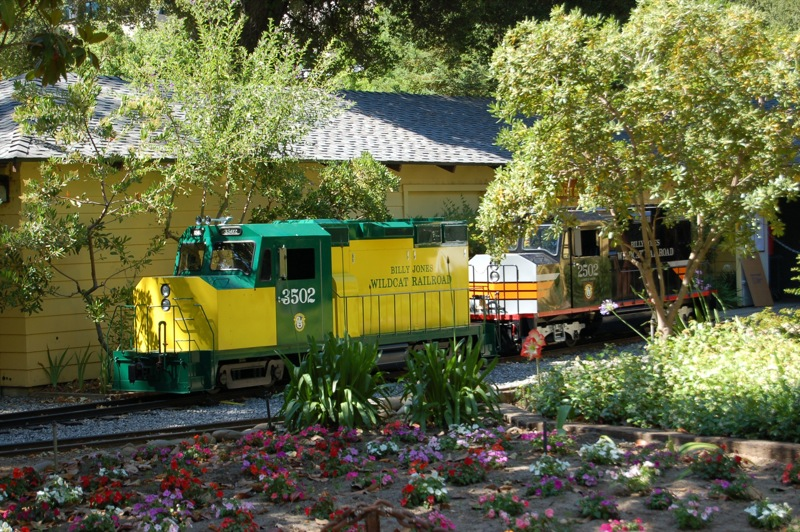
Diesel locomotives #3502 and #2502

The railroad purchased another diesel locomotive in 2006 and dubbed it #3502. It wears the colors of the Chicago and North Western Railway (it was originally meant to be painted in the green colors of the passenger cars, but was in C&NW colors to reflect its Chicago origins). #3502 started construction at Custom Locomotive in Chicago, but was finished by the Merrick Light Railway Works after CLW ceased operations. 3502 was later named Larry H. Pederson, in honor of a railroad board member. Both diesels, built in the style of an EMD GP60M, continue to operate weekdays during summer and weekends during winter and early spring when the 2-spot is winterized. A third diesel, #4, built in 2008 by volunteer Tom Waterfall in the style of a Davenport Locomotive Works locomotive, is used in work train service, and also sees use as a yard switcher; it is the only diesel on the railroad with separate throttle and reverser levers, and rides rougher due to its 0-4-0 wheel arrangement as opposed to the normal B-B arrangement. The restored 2-spot operates weekends from late spring until the end of fall, with sporadic weekday appearances.

In May 2013, the railroad took delivery of a second steam locomotive, #5. The locomotive is a 4-6-2 oil burner built by the Merrick Light Railway Works, which also built 3502. The 5-spot was put in rotation with the 2-spot to avoid having to use 2502 or 3502 when either steam locomotive breaks down. Several local media outlets printed information that the 2-spot would be retired, and the 5-spot would replace her. However, railroad management stated on Facebook that the 2-spot would "always be a staple of the railroad", and the articles were edited. #5 is identical to locomotive #1919, which operates at the Little Amerricka Amusement Park in Marshall, Wisconsin, the only difference being that #1919 runs on a gauge two inches narrower than the BJWRR. Both locomotives are operated on Billy Jones Day, usually the last Sunday of July, taking turns running trains and even running a doubleheader; in 2021, to make up for the railroad not being able to commemorate its 50th anniversary in 2020 due to the COVID-19 pandemic, the railroad ran two-train operations for the first time (and most likely only time, due to how complex it was, often leaving entire trains of passengers waiting at the mainline switch in direct sunlight) in its history. 2502 and 3502 have also occasionally doubleheaded trains, and in more recent years, have been used in push–pull operations to expedite turnarounds (this involves disengaging the transmission on the trailing locomotive to avoid dragging the locomotive and flat-spotting the wheels).

For decades, the railroad had another steam locomotive on the property, a 2-6-0 oil burner built for Coit's Eastlake Park Scenic Railway in Los Angeles. Numbered 1903, it was a predecessor to the Venice Miniature Railway locomotives, operating at Venice for periods as relief power. After Coit's death, No. 1903 ran at Urbita Springs in San Bernardino before finding its way to Council Crest Amusement Park in Portland, Oregon, after which the trail went cold for decades. By the mid-1970s, the remains of the locomotive, its boiler gone and a Model A engine installed to power it, were discovered abandoned in a field by Bill Krauss of Scio, OR. The BJWRR approached Krauss, whose own railroad was 24" gauge, and arranged a long-term loan agreement that ended with its outright sale to the BJWRR some 25 years later. The locomotive was planned to be restored to operation, but was eventually deaccessioned to volunteer Ken Middlebrook when it was determined that the 3-spot was too small to handle the trains. In its place, the railroad opted to commission Merrick to build the more powerful #5, though fundraiser events for the locomotive's construction were publicly for the 3-spot, the existence of the 5-spot not being public knowledge until she arrived at the railroad. The locomotive is being restoring the locomotive, with plans to regauge it to 15 in gauge for guest appearances at other grand scale lines such as the Redwood Valley Railway due to the rarity of 18 in gauge.

The railroad owns five open-air passenger cars, four of which came from Billy Jones' ranch, and were originally built for the Overfair Railway at the 1915 Panama–Pacific International Exposition (other cars and locomotives from the railway are currently at the Swanton Pacific Railroad), and a special handicap car for wheelchair passengers built in the mid-1990s for ADA compliance. Each of the regular cars can seat up to 24 passengers, while the handicap car can seat up to three wheelchairs or roughly 12 passengers. A train composed of all five cars can carry 108 passengers. This can create capacity issues on the railroad's busiest days. To alleviate this issue, the railroad commenced construction on a fifth regular car, which is slightly different in construction, using modular seats for easier cleaning. Because the original car drawings are lost, the railroad had to resort to reverse-engineering one of the existing cars. The car, named LIVE OAK, entered revenue service on December 10, 2016. A full six-car train can seat up to 132 passengers at once, 120 if the handicap car is not used. In the following years, Cars 1-4 were rebuilt by volunteers to the same standards as LIVE OAK. In addition to the passenger cars, the railroad also owns a utility flat and a ballast hopper for work trains, plus three flatcars donated to the railroad in 2015, of which only one is rail-worthy and mainly used for storing the ramps used to get equipment on and off trucks. A self-propelled motorcar affectionately known as the "Putt-Putt" was used as a weedspraying car until it was scrapped sometime in 2012 for being unsafe, as well as the city forbidding the use of conventional weedspray in Vasona Park, forcing the railroad to use its own blend, as well as pull weeds by hand.

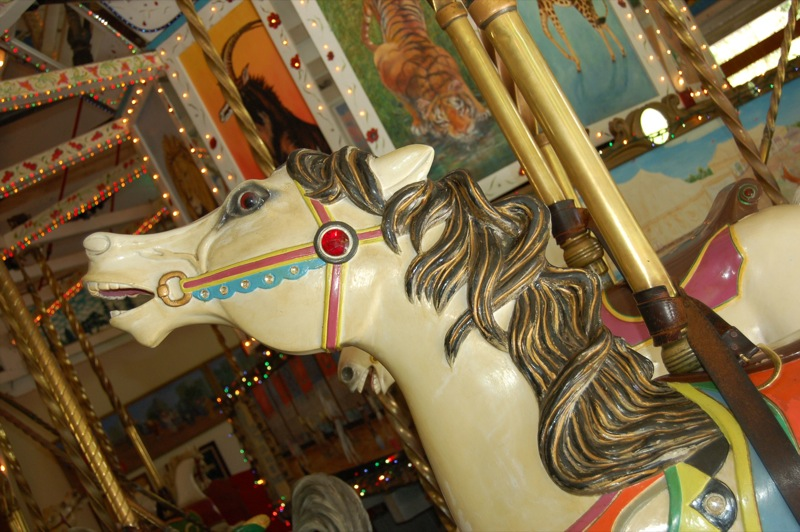
Historic Savage carousel

The Billy Jones Wildcat Railroad also operates a historic Savage carousel named after one of the organization's founders, William "Bill" Mason. The carousel is located next to the railroad's depot in Oak Meadow Park and has its own unique history, having taken part in the 1915 Panama–Pacific International Exposition in San Francisco. It is one of three historic clockwise-turning English carousels in the United States.

== See also ==
- Long Beach and Asbury Park Railway, the first railway of John J. Coit, the designer and operator of the 2-spot locomotive
- Eastlake Park Scenic Railway, the second railway of John J. Coit
- Venice Miniature Railway, the third railway of John J. Coit
- Rail transport in Walt Disney Parks and Resorts
