= San Miguel Chapel Site =

Historic church in California, United States

- U.S. National Register of Historic Places
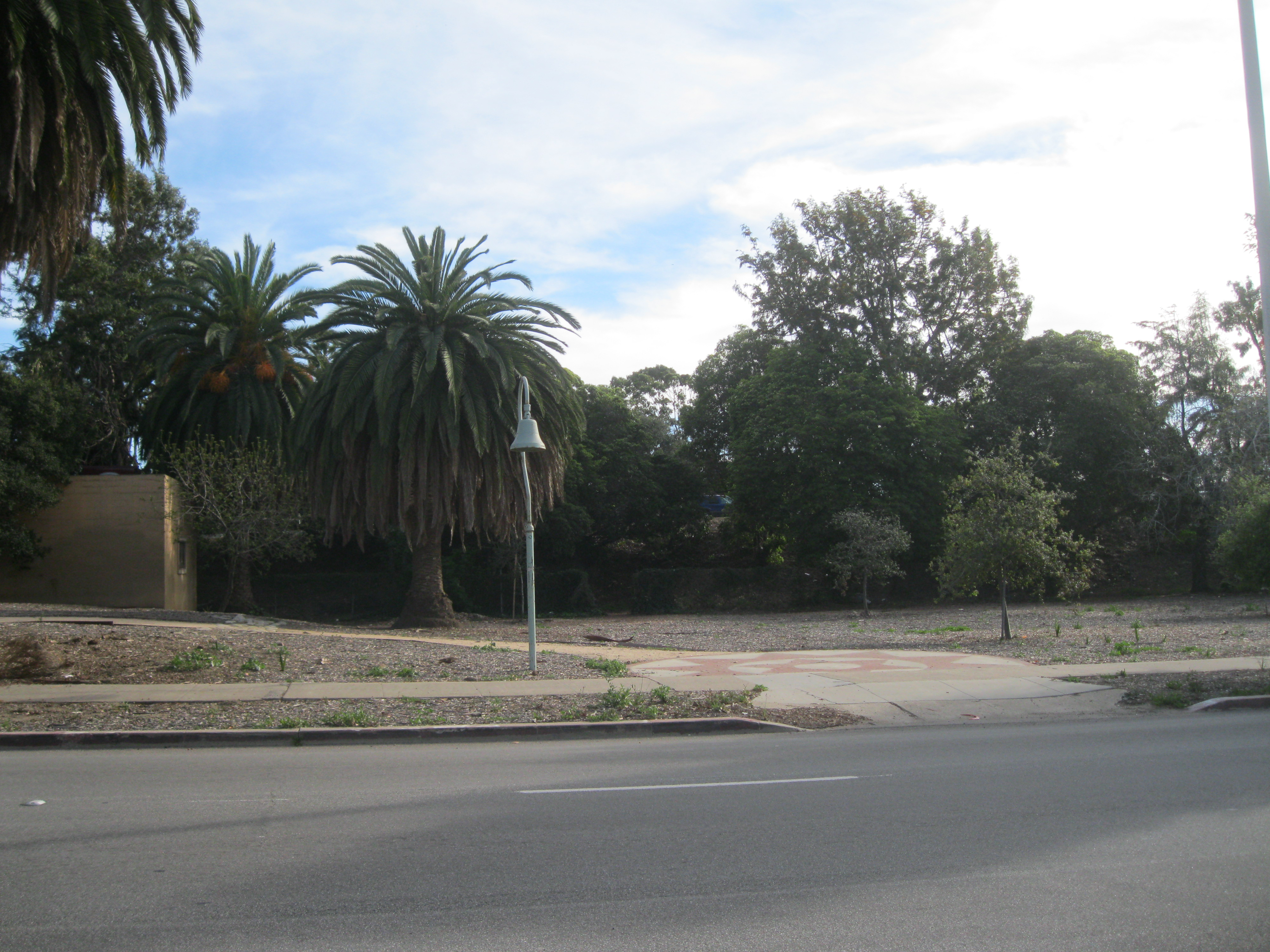
- A Mission Bell and monument sign mark the natural park site.

- Location within California Location within the United States
- Nearest city: Ventura, California
- Coordinates: 34°16′41″N 119°17′48″W
- Area: 0.7 acres (0.28 ha)
- Built: 1819
- NRHP reference No.: 78000826
- Added to NRHP: July 20, 1978

The San Miguel Chapel Site is an archeological site in Ventura, California, United States, at the location of the first outpost and center of operations that was established while the first Mission San Buenaventura was being constructed. The San Miguel Chapel was located just outside the southwest corner of the walled garden that was constructed as part of the ultimate layout of the mission complex. The open space park is located at the southwest corner of Thompson Boulevard and Palm Street in downtown Ventura. Interpretative signs and public art have been added to the site, which is protected and managed as a natural environment by the city parks department.

== History ==
The site was excavated, beginning in 1974, by students from Moorpark College who uncovered rock foundations, the aqueduct that served the mission compound, and portions of a painted wall. As the city began to acquire the site in 1975, (Note: The initial Grant Deed (Clerk's Deed 3365) recorded 1 August 1975 in Book 4440, Page 79 of Official Records for the half of the ultimate site nearest Palm Street. The rest of the site was acquired with three deeds: Grant Deed (Clerk's Deed 3428) recorded 25 March 1977 in Book 4801, Page 502; Grant Deed (Clerk's Deed 3429) recorded 7 April 1977 in Book 4811, Page 809; and Grant Deed (Clerk's Deed 3430) recorded 25 March 1977 in Book 4801, Page 526; all of Official Records) the City Council endorsed the application for the site to be placed on the national register and designated this site "Historic Point of Interest Number 16." The site was listed on the National Register of Historic Places in 1978. In 1997, the Historic Preservation Alliance of San Buenaventura put the site on a list of the top ten most endangered historical sites, stating it "sits locked up, fenced off and overgrown".

A nearby 2007 archaeological dig, uncovered a portion of the wall foundation as expected from historical surveys and maps. The mission orchard wall was built with large stones, some 40 to 50 pounds. The dig, performed before new apartments were built, found artifacts from many periods including Ventura County's first courthouse and jail, and its first hospital. The dig also revealed signs of the long history of human settlement in the area around the mission such as beads made of shells harvested from the nearby ocean.

== Geography ==
Archaeological discoveries in the area suggest that humans have populated the region for at least 10,000-12,000 years. Nearby Shisholop Village was the site of a Chumash village believed to have been a provincial capital. Archaeological records show that the village was settled sometime around 1000 A.D. They launched plank-built boats called Tomols that sailed to the Channel Islands. The village site, located where Figueroa Street meets the ocean at Seaside Park, was designated Historic Point of Interest #18 by the city.

"Coast Live Oak Tree, Historic Landmark Number 96," is a mature Quercus agrifolia designated by City Council resolution on March 27, 2006. Located at the southwest corner of the chapel site, the tree is the largest of its species within the City of Ventura and estimated to be 160 to 200 years old. (Note: Based on the trunk diameter at breast height of 52 inches) (Note: 34°16′40.5″N 119°17′49.5″W Landmark #96: Coast Live Oak Tree) Lying along the commemorative route connecting the California missions, El Camino Real, a mission bell marker has been erected here.

== See also ==
- City of Ventura Historic Landmarks and Districts
- National Register of Historic Places listings in Ventura County, California
