= Rancho Cañada de San Miguelito =

Mexican land grant in Ventura County, California

Coordinates: 34.330°N 119.330°W

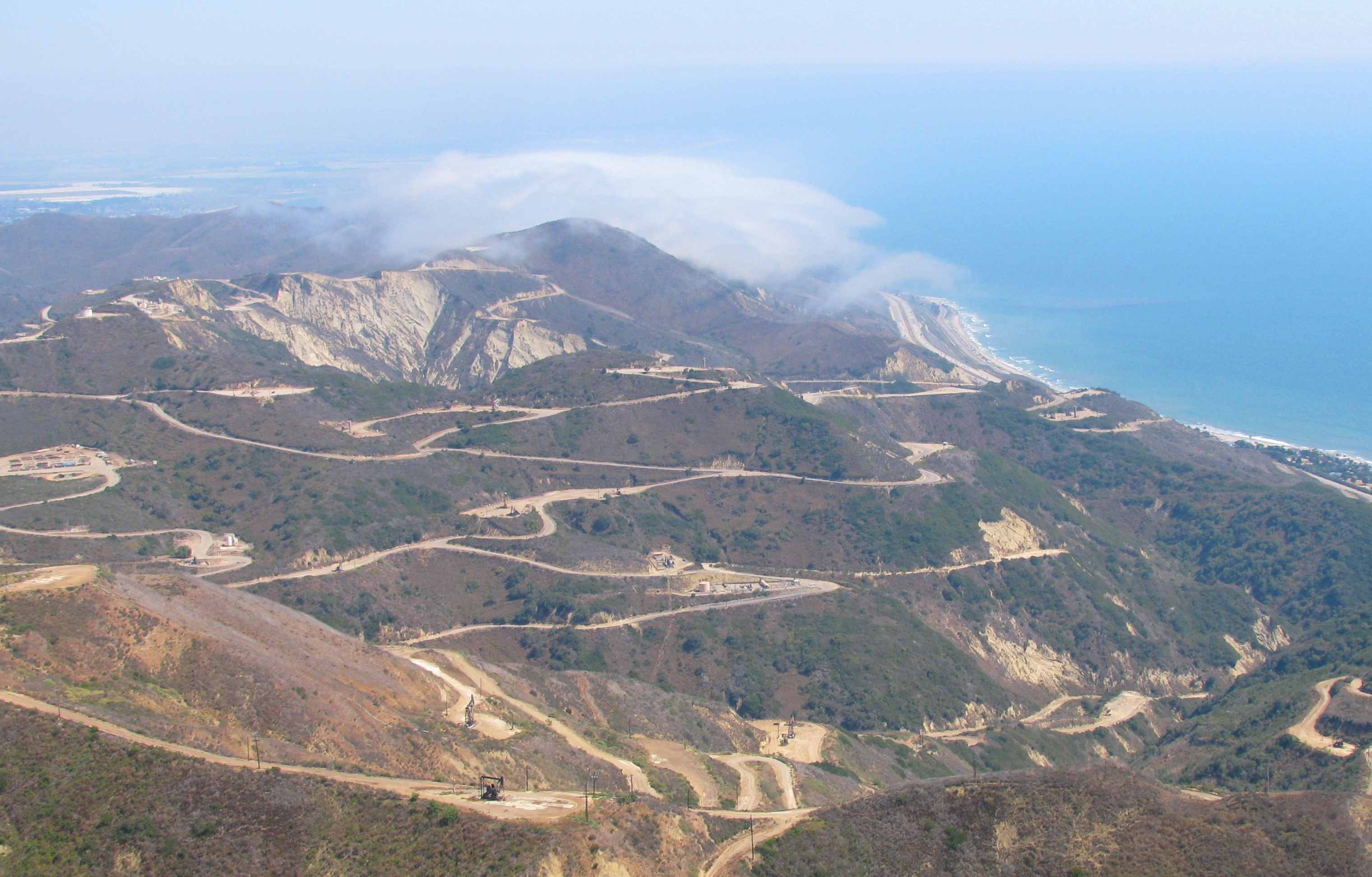
Aerial view of the San Miguelito Oil Field and coast at the Taylor Ranch, originally Rancho Cañada de San Miguelito.

Rancho Cañada de San Miguelito was a 8,877-acre (35.92 km^{2}) Mexican land grant in present-day Ventura County, California, given in 1846 by Governor Pío Pico to Ramón Rodríguez. The name means valley of San Miguelito. The grant extended between the Pacific coast and the west bank of the Ventura River. On the east bank of the Ventura River was Rancho Cañada Larga o Verde and to the south was Rancho San Miguel, Rancho Ex-Mission San Buenaventura, and present day Ventura.

== History ==
The two square league Rancho Cañada de San Miguelito (which included Cañada del Diablo) was granted to Ramón Rodríguez. Rodríguez married Juana Tico. Rodríguez was killed in 1848 while part of a posse looking for bandits who had been terrorizing ranches in the region. A bandit was mortally wounded by Rodríguez, who was, in turn, killed by a bullet from that bandit's gun. The surviving bandits, Joseph Lynch, Peter Remer and Peter Quin were executed by firing squad in Santa Barbara on December 28, 1848.

With the cession of California to the United States following the Mexican-American War, the 1848 Treaty of Guadalupe Hidalgo provided that the land grants would be honored. As required by the Land Act of 1851, a claim for Rancho Cañada de San Miguelito was filed with the Public Land Commission in 1853, and the grant was patented to Juana Tico de Rodríguez heirs of Ramón Rodríguez in 1871.

=== Taylor Ranch ===
Green B. Taylor, born 1819 in Alabama, married Nancy A. Donohoo in Tennessee in 1846. Taylor came to California by sea in 1852, and engaged in farming and stock-raising in northern and southern California. In 1870, he bought Rancho Cañada de San Miguelito, and the property became known as the Taylor Ranch. Taylor ran sheep on the land until his death near the turn of the century. On the death in 1911 of Taylor's widow, her will stipulated that her assets be sold and one-third of the proceeds be used to found a university in Ventura County. Taylor’s three surviving children successfully contested their mother’s will and the property reverted to Edward Taylor, Charles Taylor and Alice Taylor Grubb.

In 1931, oil was discovered on the ranch, commencing development of the San Miguelito Oil Field. This field became one of the most prolific oil fields in the region.

Alice Taylor Grubb was the principal owner until she died at age 81 in 1935. Her children assumed control around 1936. Son Percy Grubb died soon after, leaving the 30,000-acre Taylor Ranch to daughter Emma Grubb Wood and her rancher/philanthropist husband Adrian "Buddy" Wood. When Emma Wood died in 1944 at age 63, Buddy Wood became the sole owner. He donated coastal land in her memory for Emma Wood State Beach. When Buddy Wood died in 1971, the estate was divided between second wife Ailene Barnes Wood and her daughter Cynthia Wood. It is now owned by the Wood-Claeyssens Foundation.
