= Rancho Cañada Larga o Verde =

Mexican land grant in Ventura County, California

Coordinates: 34.360°N 119.260°W

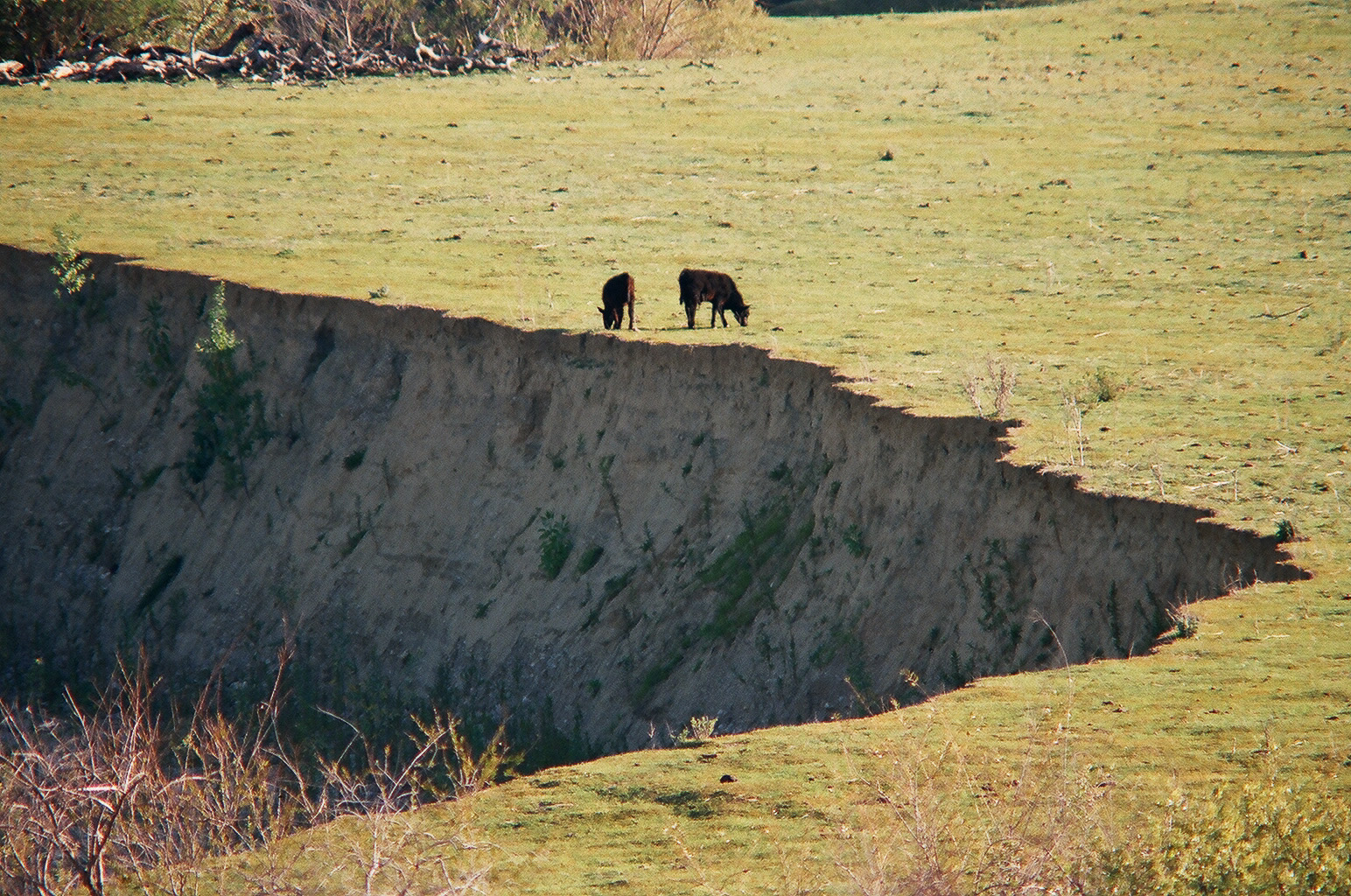
Cattle grazing in Cañada Larga valley

Rancho Cañada Larga o Verde was a 6,659-acre (26.95 km^{2}) Mexican land grant in present-day Ventura County, California given in 1841 by Governor Juan B. Alvarado to Joaquina Alvarado. The grant extended along Sulphur Canyon Creek, east of the Ventura River, between Ventura and Ojai. To the west, across the Ventura River was Rancho Cañada de San Miguelito; to the north Rancho Ojai; and to the south and east Rancho Ex-Mission San Buenaventura.

== History ==
Ana Joaquina Alvarado (1788–1863) was the widow of Gabriel Moraga. Gabriel Antonio Moraga (1765–1823) came to California with the De Anza Expedition, and married Ana Maria Bernal (1770–1802) in 1784. Gabriel enlisted in the San Francisco Company in 1783 and served at the Presidio of San Francisco and Monterey. After Ana Bernal died, Moraga married Joaquina Alvarado in 1806. He was alferez in 1806; brevet lieutenant in 1811; full lieutenant at Santa Barbara in 1817.

With the cession of California to the United States following the Mexican-American War, the 1848 Treaty of Guadalupe Hidalgo provided that the land grants would be honored. As required by the Land Act of 1851, a claim for Rancho Cañada Larga o Verde was filed with the Public Land Commission in 1852, and the grant was patented to Joaquina Alvarado in 1873. The grant was for one-half square league, but was surveyed as one and one-half square leagues.

Frenchman, Anselme Canet (1833–1914) came to New York City and married Catherine Brannigan in 1863. Canet moved his family to Ventura in 1874 and immediately he branched out into the cattle business and acquired Rancho Cañada Larga y Verde.

In 2025, the Trust for Public Land received a grant to acquire nearly 6,500 acres (2,600 ha) of the rancho.

== Historic sites ==
- San Buenaventura Mission Aqueduct
- Santa Gertrudis Asistencia
