= Emma Wood State Beach =

California State Beach in Ventura

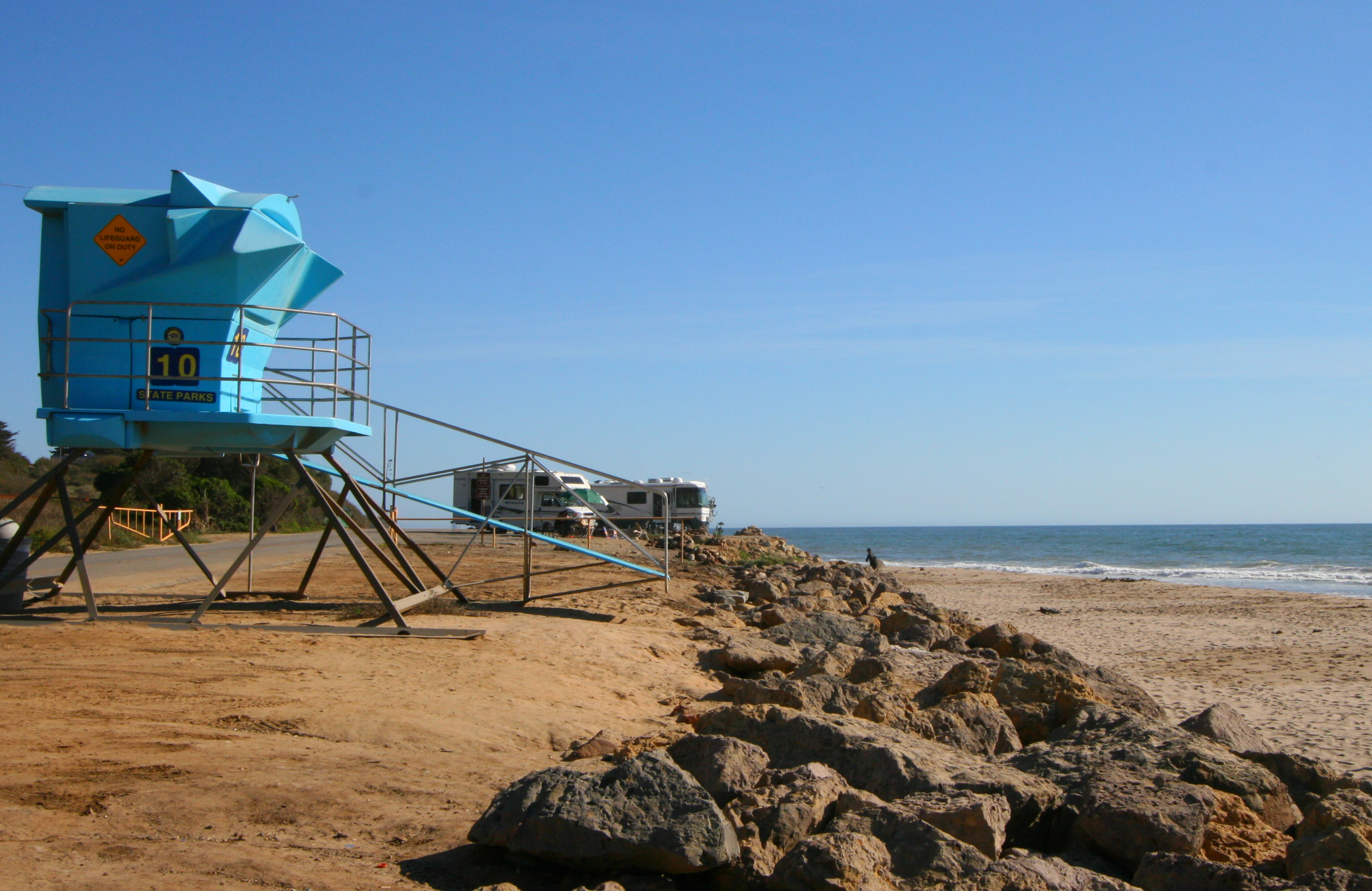
- Lifeguard tower and campsites overlooking the ocean

- Location within California Location within the United States
- Location: Ventura County, California, United States
- Nearest city: Ventura, California
- Coordinates: 34°17′7″N 119°19′32″W
- Area: 112 acres (45 ha)
- Established: 1957
- Governing body: California Department of Parks and Recreation
- Website: Official website

Emma Wood State Beach is a California State Beach in Ventura, California. It is located on the Santa Barbara Channel on the west side of the Ventura River estuary and south of the railroad tracks of the Coast Line and the US Highway 101 freeway.

The beach is named after Emma Grubb Wood who once owned the 8,000 acres (3,237 ha) Taylor Ranch. The beach is popular for walking, fishing, swimming, and surfing. It also includes a primitive campground for recreational vehicles and the remains of World War II artillery emplacements.

== History ==
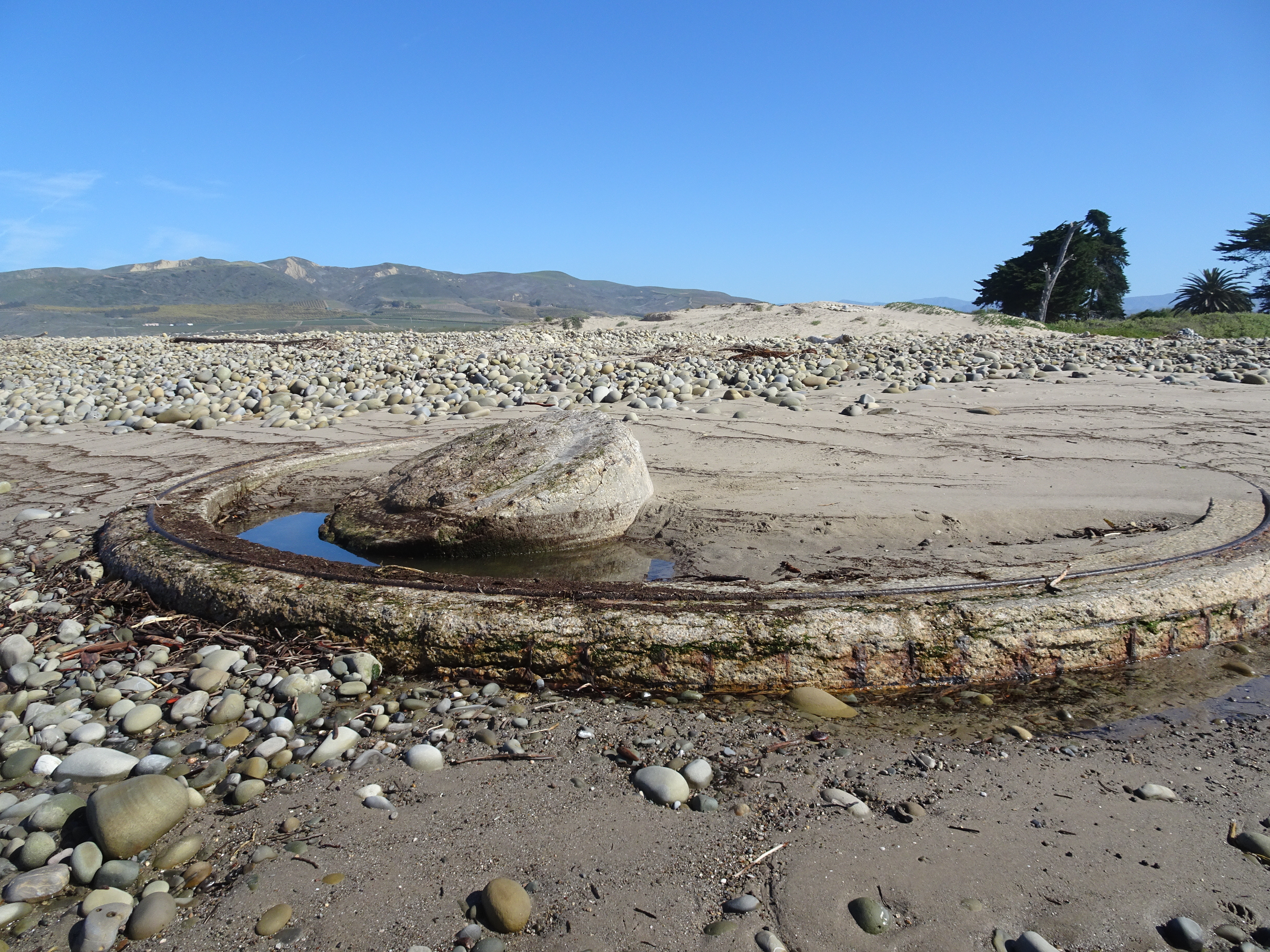
Remains of WWII artillery emplacement

The park is named for Emma Grubb Wood (May 23, 1881-September 19, 1944). Wood was the daughter of Alice Taylor Grubb, the owner of the Taylor Ranch (originally the Rancho Cañada de San Miguelito), an 8,000-acre sheep ranch on which oil was discovered in the 1930s. When Alice Taylor Grubb died in 1936, she left the ranch to her daughter Alice and son Percy. Percy, who was unmarried, committed suicide in December 1937 by carbon monoxide poisoning in a garage owned by Emma Wood's husband, Adrian "Buddy" Wood.

Wood died in 1944 in Carpinteria. At the time of her death, her land holdings, which included the Taylor Ranch, were valued at $8 million.

Adrian Wood inherited the Taylor Ranch from Emma, and in 1956, Adrian, gave land totaling 112-acre (45 ha) with 7,600 feet of ocean frontage to the State of California. The land became the Emma Wood State Beach, which opened in 1957.

== Features ==
Emma Wood State Beach is popular for walking, fishing, swimming, and surfing.

The Wood property and the adjoining Seaside Wilderness Park (owned by the City of Ventura) include multiple ecosystems, including sand dunes, a flood plain, cobblestone beach, riparian woodland, and wetlands. At the eastern edge of the beach, the Ventura River estuary attracts a variety of wildlife, including great blue herons. A total of 300 plant species and 233 species of birds have been identified in the area. The Ocean's Edge Trail runs through both the Wood and Seaside properties. Dolphins are also sometimes seen off the coast from the beach; the Los Angeles Times in 1997 wrote that Emma Wood is the "best bet" for dolphin watching.

The beach includes the remains of two artillery installations built in 1942 in response to the Bombardment of Ellwood, a Japanese submarine attack on the Ellwood Oil Field.

The park also include a primitive campground for recreational vehicles. There are no sewage, water, or electricity connections, and no tent camping is allowed.

== Gallery ==
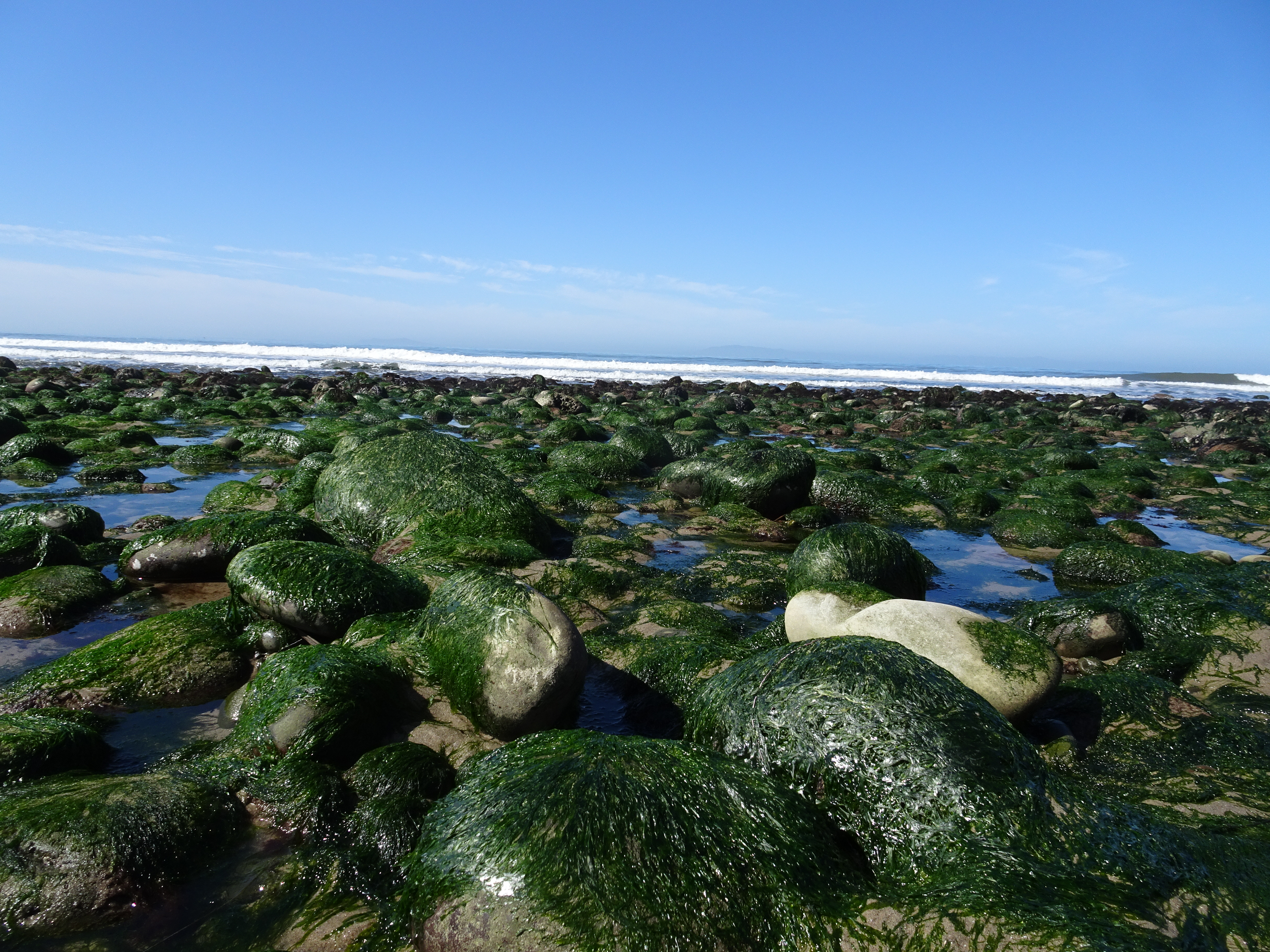
Tide pools at low tide

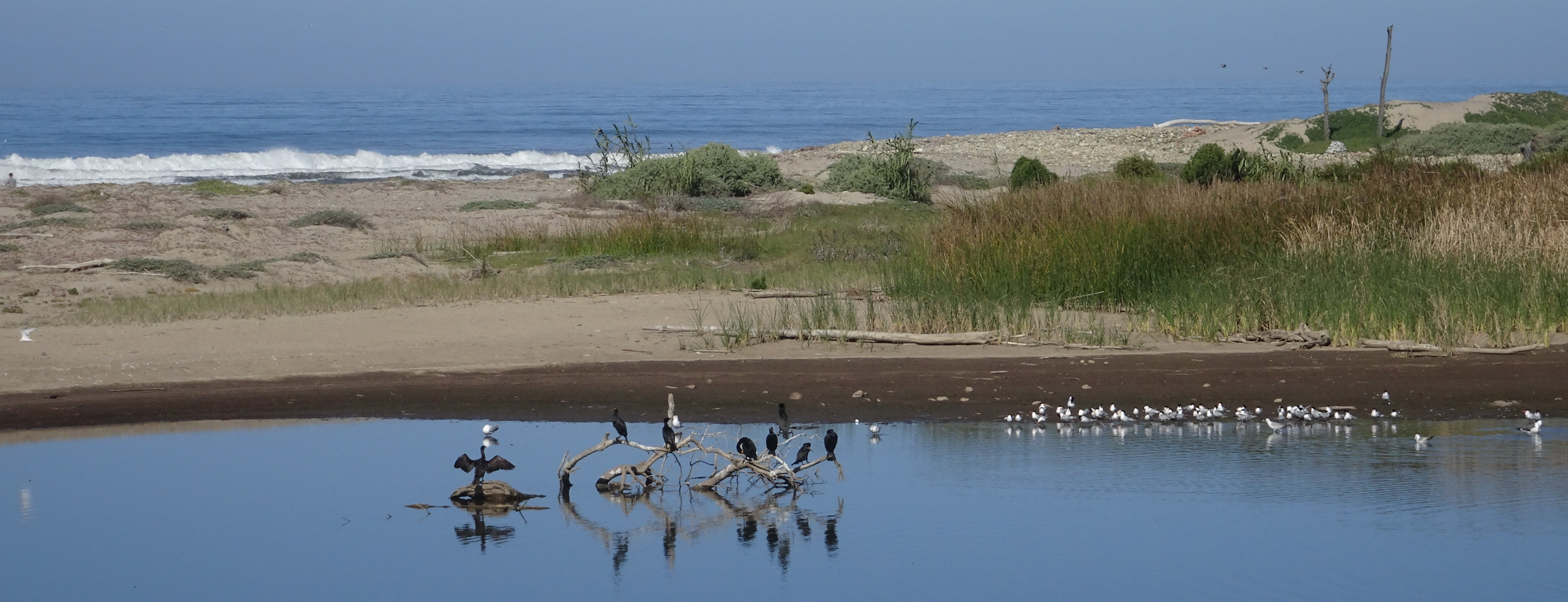
Birds in Ventura River estuary

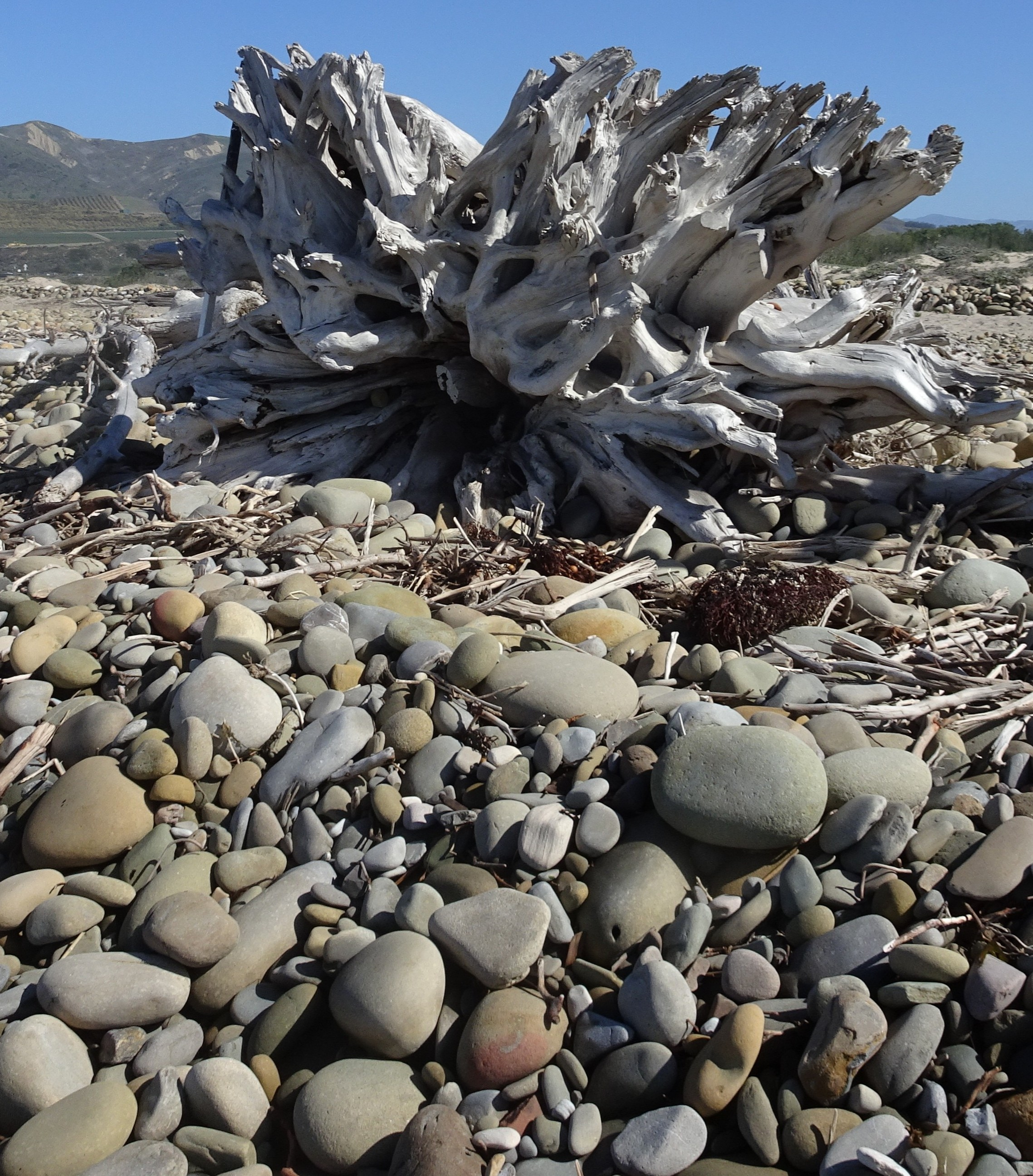
Rocks and driftwood

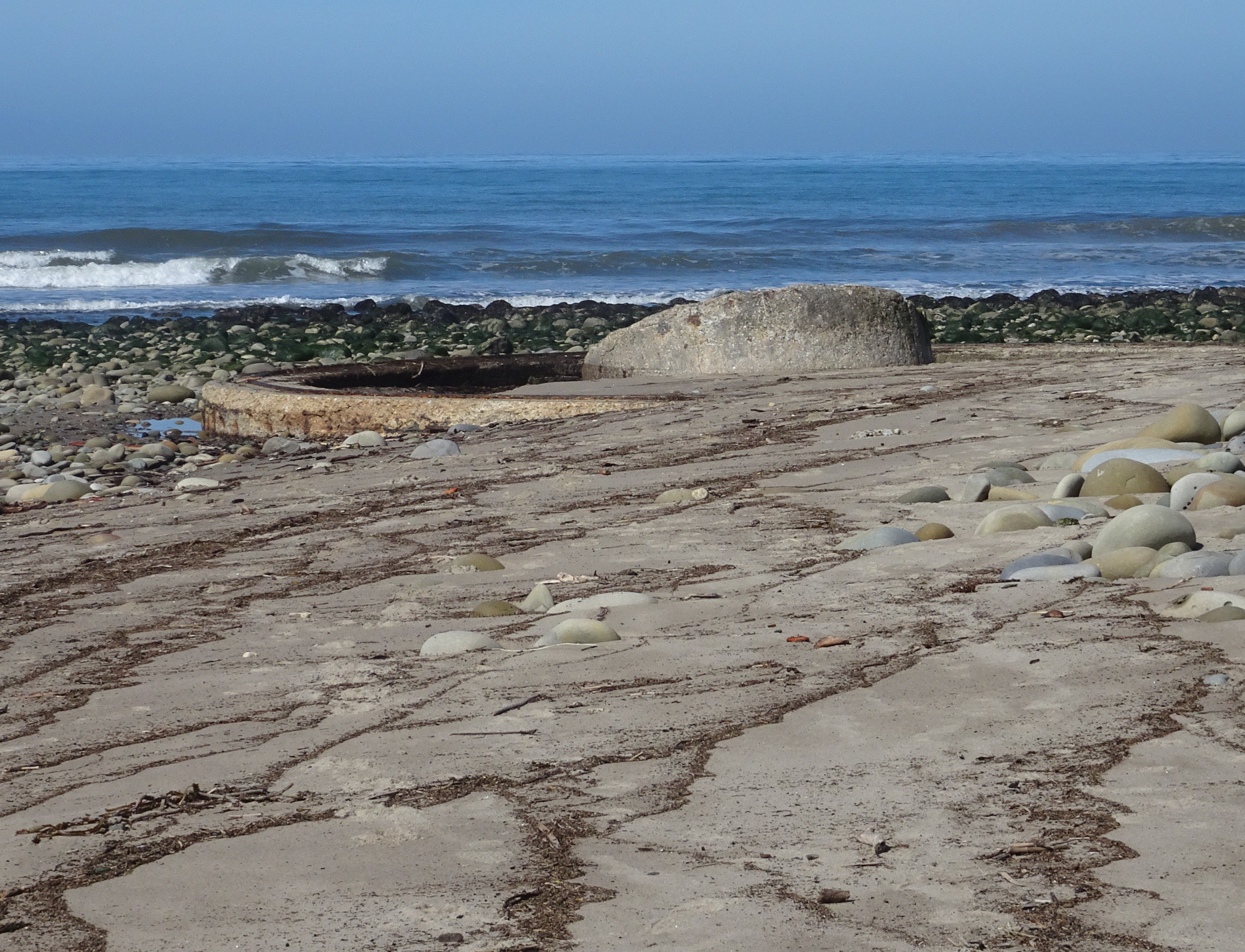
Camp Seaside artillery gun emplacement

== See also ==
- California State Beaches
- Parks in Ventura County, California
- List of California beaches
- List of California state parks
