= Mission San Buenaventura =

18th-century Spanish mission in California

Mission Basilica San Buenaventura
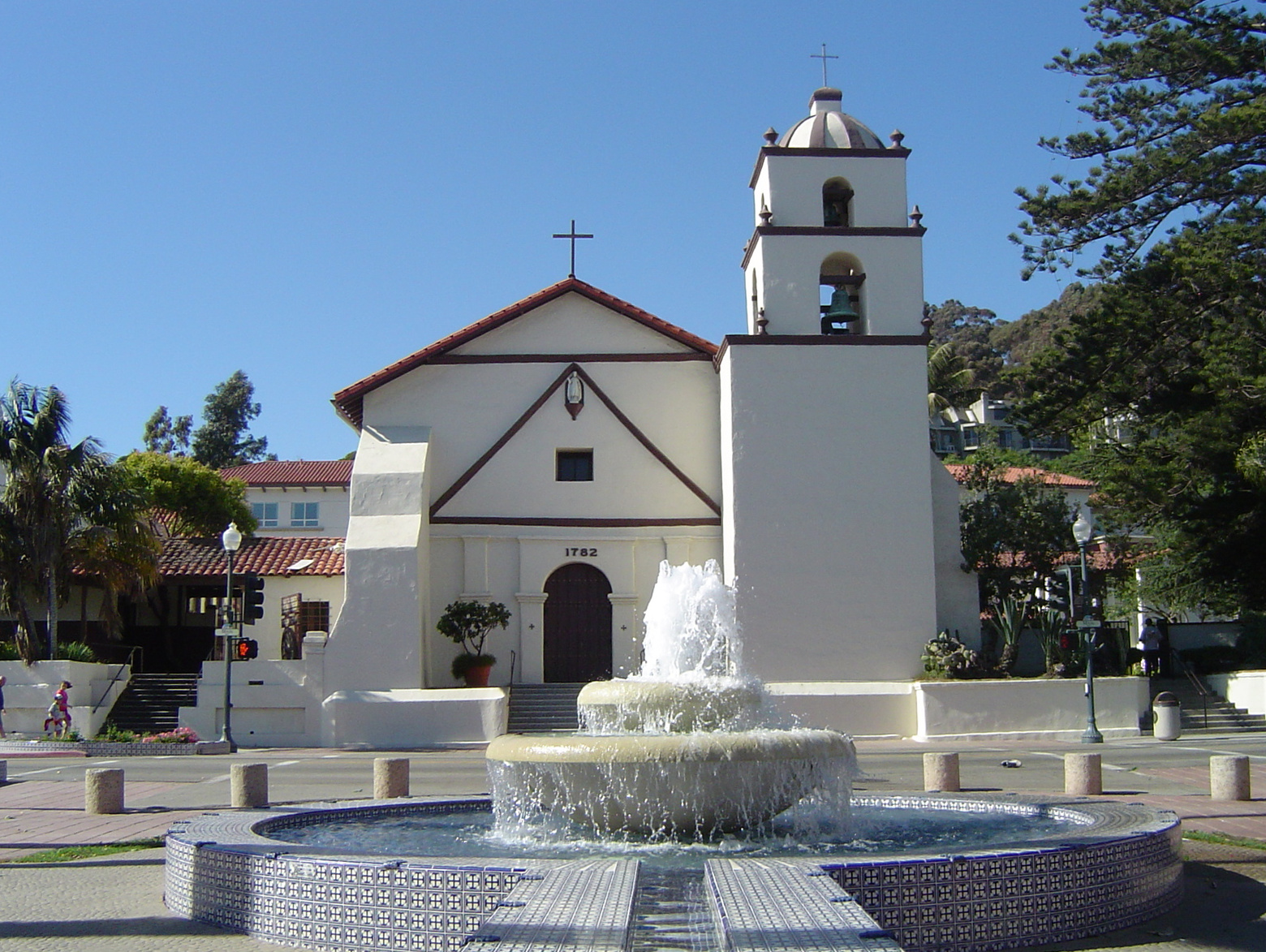
- The restored chapel at Mission San Buenaventura in July, 2005

- Location within southern California
- Location: 211 East Main street Ventura, California 93001
- Coordinates: 34°16′52″N 119°17′53″W
- Name as founded: La Misión San Buenaventura
- English translation: St. Bonaventure Mission
- Patron: St. Bonaventure
- Nickname: "Mission by the Sea"
- Founded: March 31, 1782
- Founded by: Junípero Serra, O.F.M.
- Founding Order: Ninth
- Military district: Second
- Native tribe: Chumash; Ventureño
- Native place name: Mitsqanaqa'n
- Baptisms: 3,875
- Marriages: 1,097
- Burials: 3,150
- Secularized: 1836
- Returned to the Church: 1862
- Governing body: Roman Catholic Archdiocese of Los Angeles
- Current use: Parish church / museum

U.S. National Register of Historic Places
- Official name: Mission San Buenaventura and Mission Compound Site
- Designated: 1975
- Reference no.: #75000496

California Historical Landmark
- Reference no.: #310

Website
- www.sanbuenaventuramission.org

Mission San Buenaventura (Spanish: Misión San Buenaventura, Ventureño: mitsqanaqan̓), formally known as the Mission Basilica of San Buenaventura, is a Catholic parish and basilica in the Archdiocese of Los Angeles. The parish church in the city of Ventura, California, United States, is a Spanish mission founded by the Order of Friars Minor. Founded on March 31, 1782, it was the ninth Spanish mission established in Alta California (or Nueva California) and the last to be established by the head of the Franciscan missions in California, Junípero Serra. Designated a California Historical Landmark, the mission is one of many locally designated landmarks in downtown Ventura.

The mission was named after St. Bonaventure, a 13th-century Franciscan saint, one of the early leaders of the Order to which the friars belonged, and a Doctor of the Church. On June 9, 2020, Pope Francis elevated the church to a minor basilica, and on July 15, 2020, the feast day of its patron saint, the announcement of the Pope's action was made and the elevation of the mission's status was officially proclaimed by Archbishop José Gómez of Los Angeles. The name of the mission was changed to reflect this new status in the Catholic Church.

Mission San Buenaventura was planned to be founded in 1770 and become 3rd mission, but the founding was delayed because of the low availability of the military escorts needed to establish the mission. In 1793, the first church burned down. When the mission was completed, it included an adjacent quadrangle with living and work space. All that remains of the original mission is the church and its garden.

== History ==
=== Spanish Empire ===
The founding of the San Buenaventura Mission traces to the decision on Palm Sunday, March 30, 1749, by the Franciscan friar Junipero Serra to journey to the New World as a missionary to the native peoples.

Thirty-three years and one day later he raised the Cross at "la playa de la canal de Santa Barbara" (the beach of the Santa Barbara Channel) on Easter morning, March 31, 1782. Assisted by Pedro Benito Cambon, he celebrated a High Mass, preached on the Resurrection, and dedicated a mission to San Buenaventura (St. Bonaventure). It had been planned as the third in the chain of twenty-one missions founded by Serra but was destined to be the ninth and last founded during his lifetime, and one of six he personally dedicated.

Under the direction of Friar Cambon, whom Serra left in charge of the new mission, a system of aqueducts were built by the Chumash people between 1805 and 1815 to meet the needs of the Mission population and consisted of both ditches and elevated stone masonry. The watercourse ran from a point on the Ventura River about ½ mile north of the remaining ruins and carried the water to holding tanks behind the mission, a total of about 7 miles (11 km). With plentiful water, the mission was able to maintain flourishing orchards and gardens, which were described by |English navigator George Vancouver as the finest he had seen. The water distribution system was damaged by floods and abandoned in 1862.

The mission's first church was destroyed by fire in 1793. The construction of a second church was abandoned because "the door gave way." A permanent replacement was not able to be rebuilt until 1812. About the same time, the San Miguel Chapel and the Santa Gertrudis Chapel were completed.

A series of earthquakes and an accompanying seismic sea wave in 1812 forced the friars and Indian neophytes to seek temporary shelter a few miles inland. Six years later the friars had to remove sacred objects from the church and the whole mission flee into the hills to elude an attack led by Argentine pirate Hippolyte de Bouchard, who was pillaging the missions and had just conducted a successful attack against Mission San Juan Capistrano.

=== Mexico ===
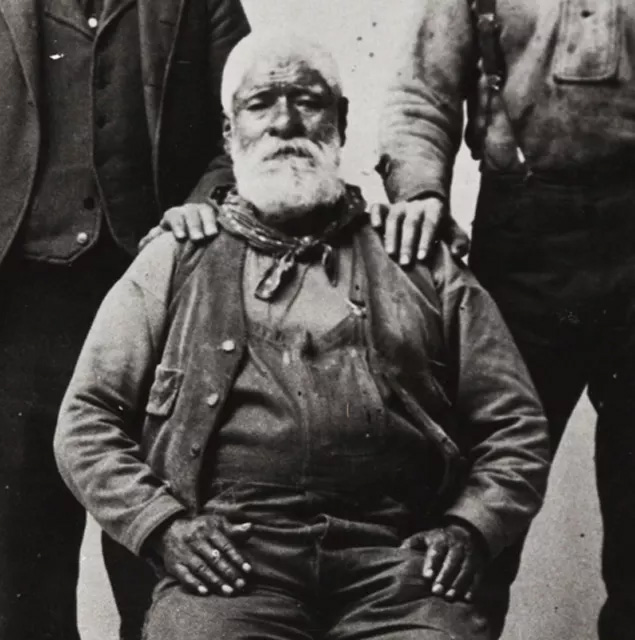
Fernando Librado, a Chumash elder and master tomol builder was born at the mission in 1839.

After its independence from Spain, in 1834 the Mexican government issued a secularization decree, divesting the friars of administrative control over the missions. In 1845 Mission San Buenaventura was rented to Jose Arnaz and Narciso Botello and was later sold illegally to Arnaz.

The mission did not fully escape the impact that the Mexican–American War of 1846–1847 had on California. On January 5, 1847, while on its way from Santa Barbara to Los Angeles, the 428 men-strong California Battalion, under the command of U.S. Army Major John C. Fremont, managed to disperse an armed force of up to 70 enemy Californios near the mission.

=== United States ===
As California had become a state of the Union, when Joseph Sadoc Alemany, O.P., was named the first Bishop of Monterey in 1850, he petitioned the United States Government to return that part of the mission holdings comprising the church, clergy residence, cemetery, orchard, and vineyard to the Catholic Church. The request was granted in the form of a proclamation by President Abraham Lincoln on May 23, 1862.

Because of severe damage in the 1857 Fort Tejon earthquake, the Mission's tile roof was replaced by a shingle roof. In 1893, Cyprian Rubio "modernized" the interior of the church, painting over the original artwork; when he finished, little of the old church was untouched. The windows were lengthened, the beamed ceiling and tile floor were covered, and the remnants of the quadrangle were razed. The west sacristy was removed to provide room for a school, which was not actually built until 1921. During the pastorate of Patrick Grogan the roof of the church was once again tiled, the convent and present rectory were built, and a new fountain was placed in the garden.

The education of children at Mission San Buenaventura has flourished intermittently since 1829 (during Mexican rule) and continuously since 1922. Originally a four-classroom structure, Holy Cross School served its students and the parish admirably since its 1922 dedication. In 1925 it was expanded to accommodate growth and in 1949 a subsequent renovation brought it out to Main Street (El Camino Real) with no space left for further expansion.

In a major restoration under the supervision of Aubrey J. O'Reilly in 1956–1957 the windows were reconstructed to their original size, and the ceiling and floor were uncovered. A long-time parishioner commissioned the casting of a bell with an automatic angelus device and donated it to the mission; it hangs in the bell tower above the four ancient hand-operated bells.

The second half of the 20th century brought more growth, as well as wear-and-tear and obsolescence, and the school's problems far exceed spatial deficiency. In response to this situation, the San Buenaventura Mission parish, under the leadership of Monsignor Patrick J. O'Brien, formed a Planning and Development Committee comprising parishioners, faculty, parish staff, and parents. In June 1994, the downtown firm of Mainstreet Architects and Planners prepared a conceptual master site plan for the mission properties, incorporating the design of a new school and an adjoining multi-purpose building which would serve both school and parish. This plan also necessitated the deconstruction of the convent and the two remaining Holy Cross Sisters moved into the larger St. Catherine by the Sea Convent, a short distance from the Mission.

The entire roof of the church was removed and replaced in 1976. In December of that year the church was solemnly consecrated by Cardinal Timothy Manning, the Archbishop of Los Angeles. In 1982 the mission marked its bicentennial. A new three-story school building, with pre-kindergarten, kindergarten, and grades 1–8, located at the base of the hill behind the Mission, was dedicated in January 2001. The school also houses the Serra Chapel for Eucharistic Adoration, adult classrooms, a parish/school kitchen, and a large assembly hall used as a school auditorium and for large parish gatherings and one Sunday Mass. The assembly room was named after O'Brien, who was the pastor of the church for 25 years until his sudden death in 2005.

A rainstorm in December 2025 damaged the bell tower.

== Description ==
All that remains of the original mission is the church and its garden. A small museum sits at the mission with displays of Chumash Indian artifacts and mission-era items. Located in the historic downtown of Ventura, very few California missions had the center of business and commerce remain at the location where the mission was established like Mission San Buenaventura. The church remains an active Catholic parish, serving approximately 2,000 families, and services are still held in the parish church. The current pastor is Tom Elewaut, who has served since 2011. A reproduction of the Pieta at St. Peter's Basilica was donated to the parish in 2018. The Father Serra statue that was removed from the plaza in front of the Ventura City Hall was installed in the garden in 2024.

== Other historic designations ==
- National Register of Historic Places #NPS–75000497 – Mission San Buenaventura Aqueduct
- California Historical Landmark #113 – Site of "Junípero Serra's Cross" (the first cross on the hill known as La Loma de la Cruz, or the "Hill of the Cross") can be found in Grant Park, and was erected by Junípero Serra upon the Mission's founding
- California Historical Landmark #114 – Old Mission Reservoir, part of the water system for Mission San Buenaventura (the settling tank or receiving reservoir; the site can be found in nearby Eastwood Park)
- California Historical Landmark #114–1 – Mission San Buenaventura Aqueduct (Cañada Larga Road, just east of State Highway 33) consists of two surviving sections of viaduct about 100 feet (30 m) long, made of cobblestone and mortar

== Mission industries ==
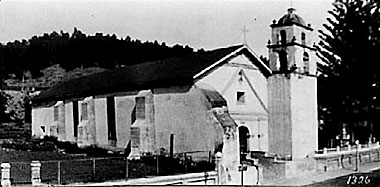
Mission San Buenaventura circa 1900. Note the thickness of the chapel side wall and the massive buttresses supporting it.

Some animals at San Buenaventura were cattle, horses, sheep, donkeys and goats. The cattle were very important because they provided food, oil and hides. In the year of 1818, 35,274 cattle wandered over the mission lands as far as the Oxnard Plain. A little time after January 7, 1831, the animal population decreased to a low of 4,000 cattle, 3,000 sheep, 300 horses and 60 mules. In July 1839, Inspector-General E.P. Hartnell found 2,208 cattle, 1,670 sheep, 799 horses, 35 mules and 65 goats. The soil around Mission San Buenaventura was very good so the mission could grow many crops. San Buenaventura grew apples, grapes, bananas, pears, plums, pomegranates, figs, oranges, coconuts, beans, grain, corn and barley. In the year of 1818, 12,483 bushels of grain were harvested. Shortly after January 7, 1831, harvests had been reduced to 1,750 bushels of wheat, 2,000 bushels of barley, 500 bushels of corn, and 400 bushels of beans. In July 1839, Inspector-General William E.P. Hartnell found 322 fanegas of wheat, 182 fanegas of corn and 35 fanegas of peas.

== Mission bells ==
Bells were vitally important to daily life at Mission San Buenaventura, which had five bells. The bells were borrowed from Mission Santa Barbara because there were no bells at the time. They were never returned. The bell facing north is labeled S. San Francisco 1781. The bell facing east has the inscription: San Pedro Alcantra 1781. A small swinging bell hangs in the southern arch with the lettering: Ave Maria S. Joseph. The only bell used daily at San Buenaventura is large and crown topped with a cross on its side. Inscribed on the bell is Ave Maria Pruysyma D Sapoyan Ano D 1825, which means "Hail Mary Most Pure. Mary of Zapopan Year of 1825." This bell was originally cast for the church of Zapopan but was later sent to Mission San Buenaventura. Another bell, which was once the gift of the Spanish Viceroy, is inscribed Marquez de Croix Mexico November 12, 1770. It is currently owned by Senora Isabel del Valle Cram. There are also two wooden bells in the museum that measure about two feet. These were the only wooden bells in the California missions.

== Gallery ==
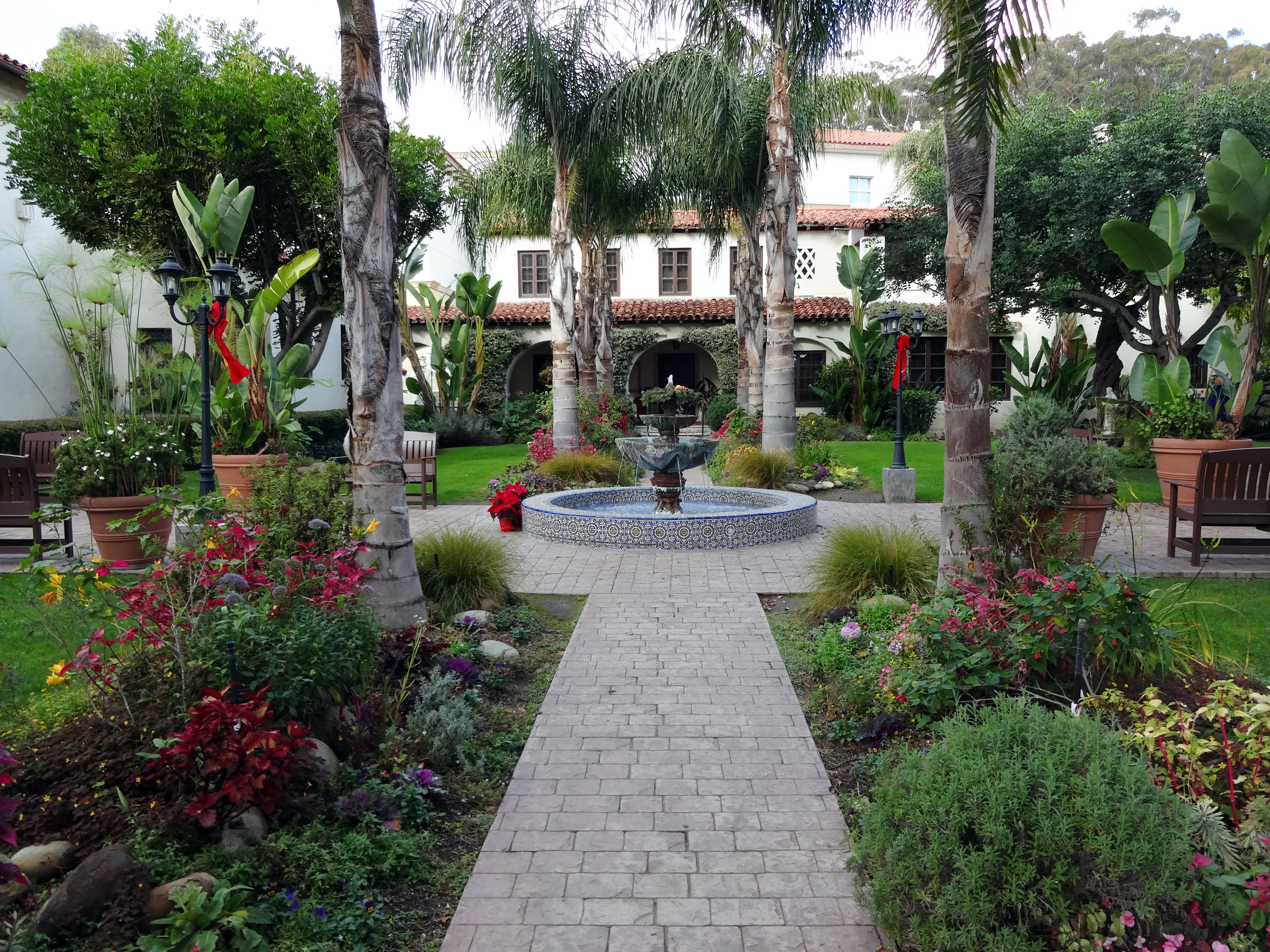
Mission courtyard

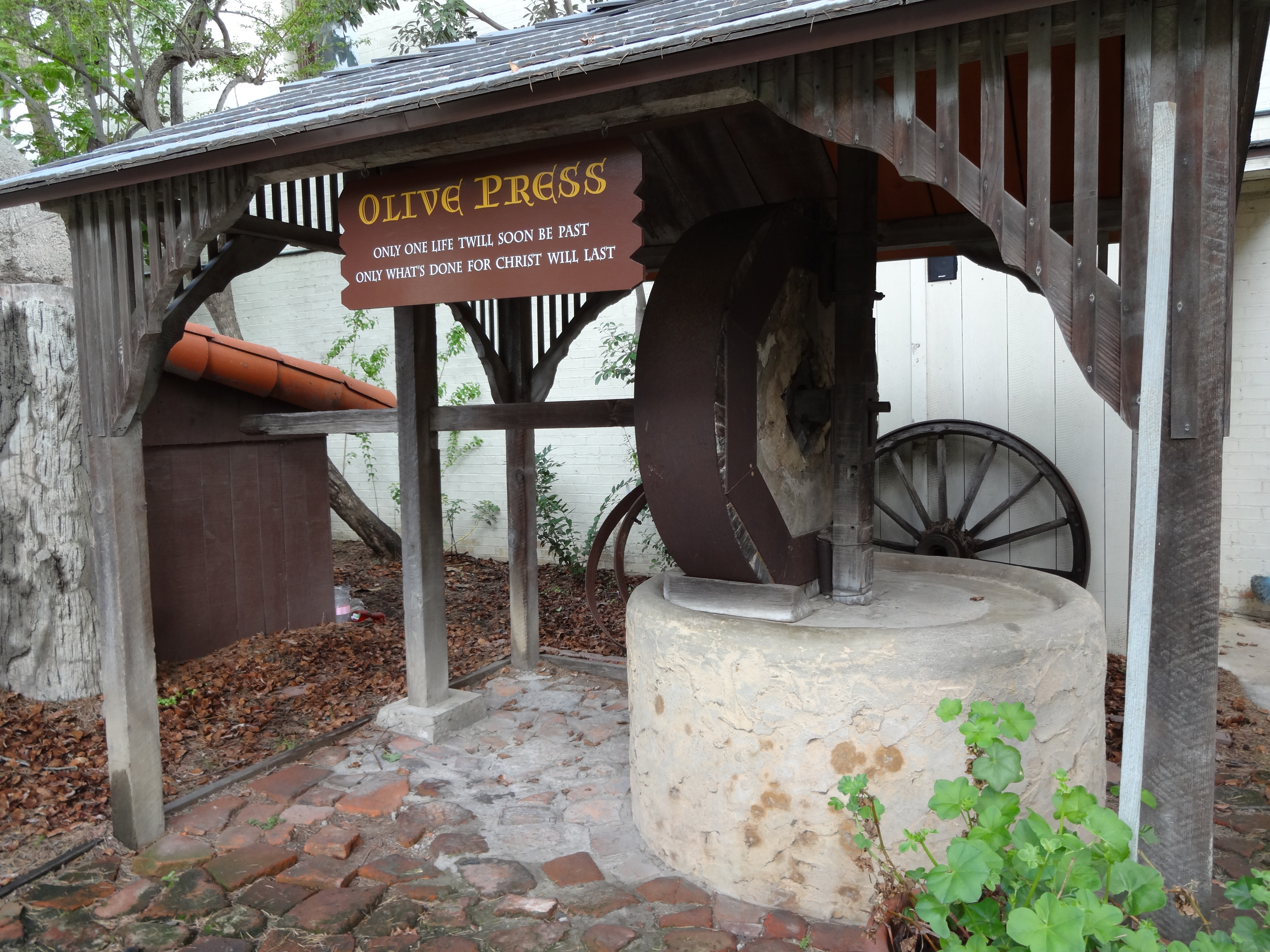
Olive oil press

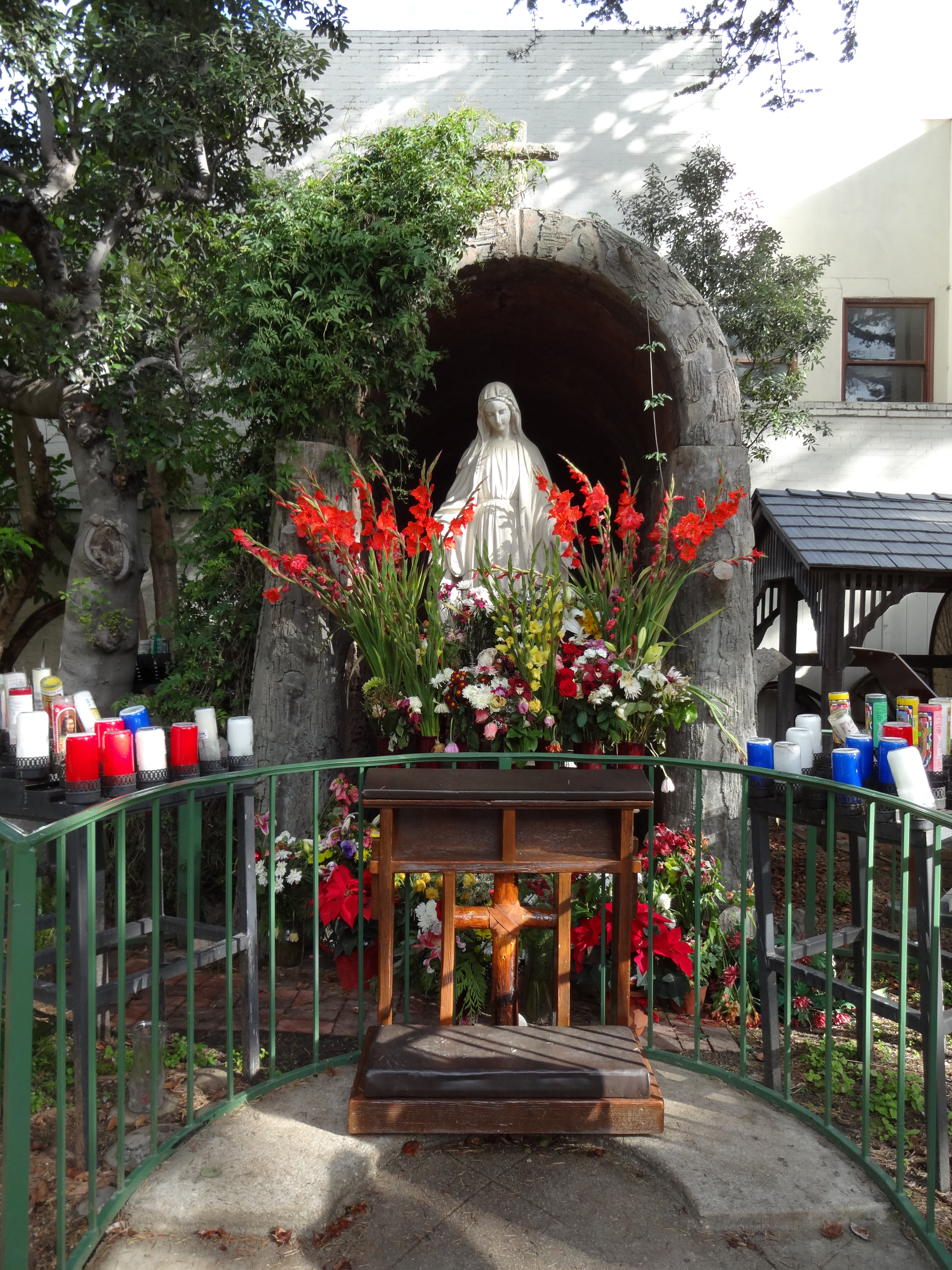
Marian shrine

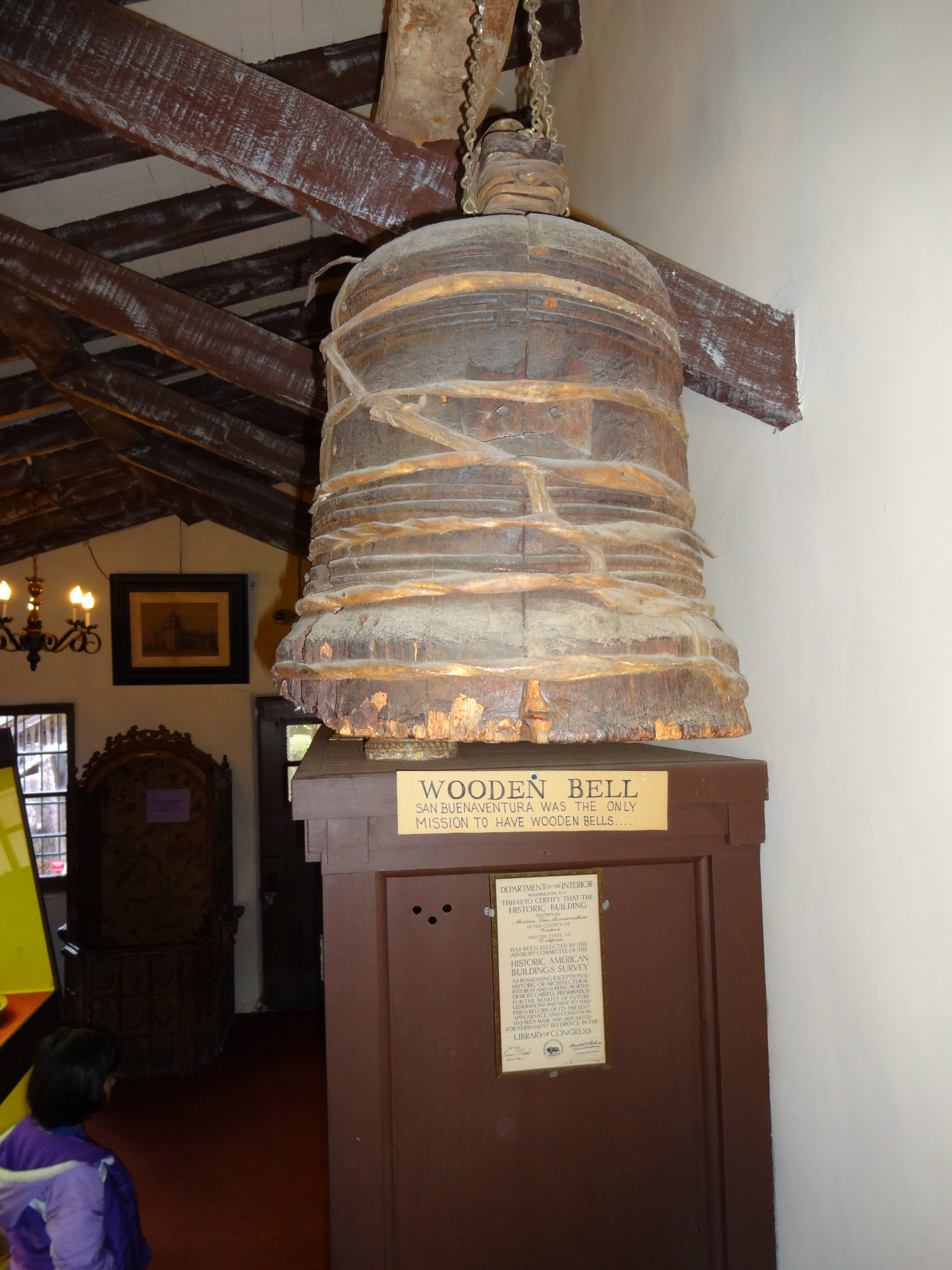
Wooden bell in the museum

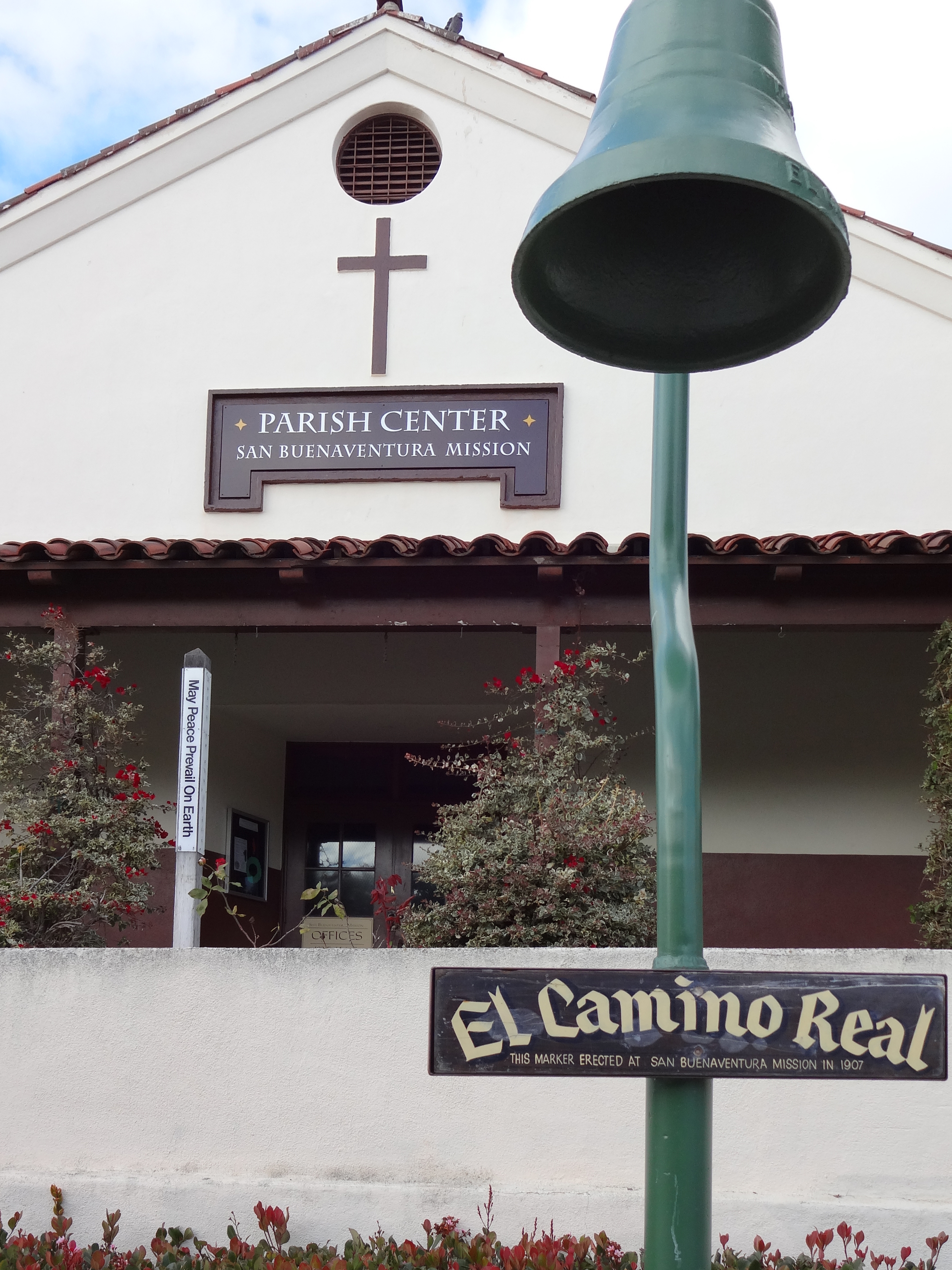
Bell marking the El Camino Real

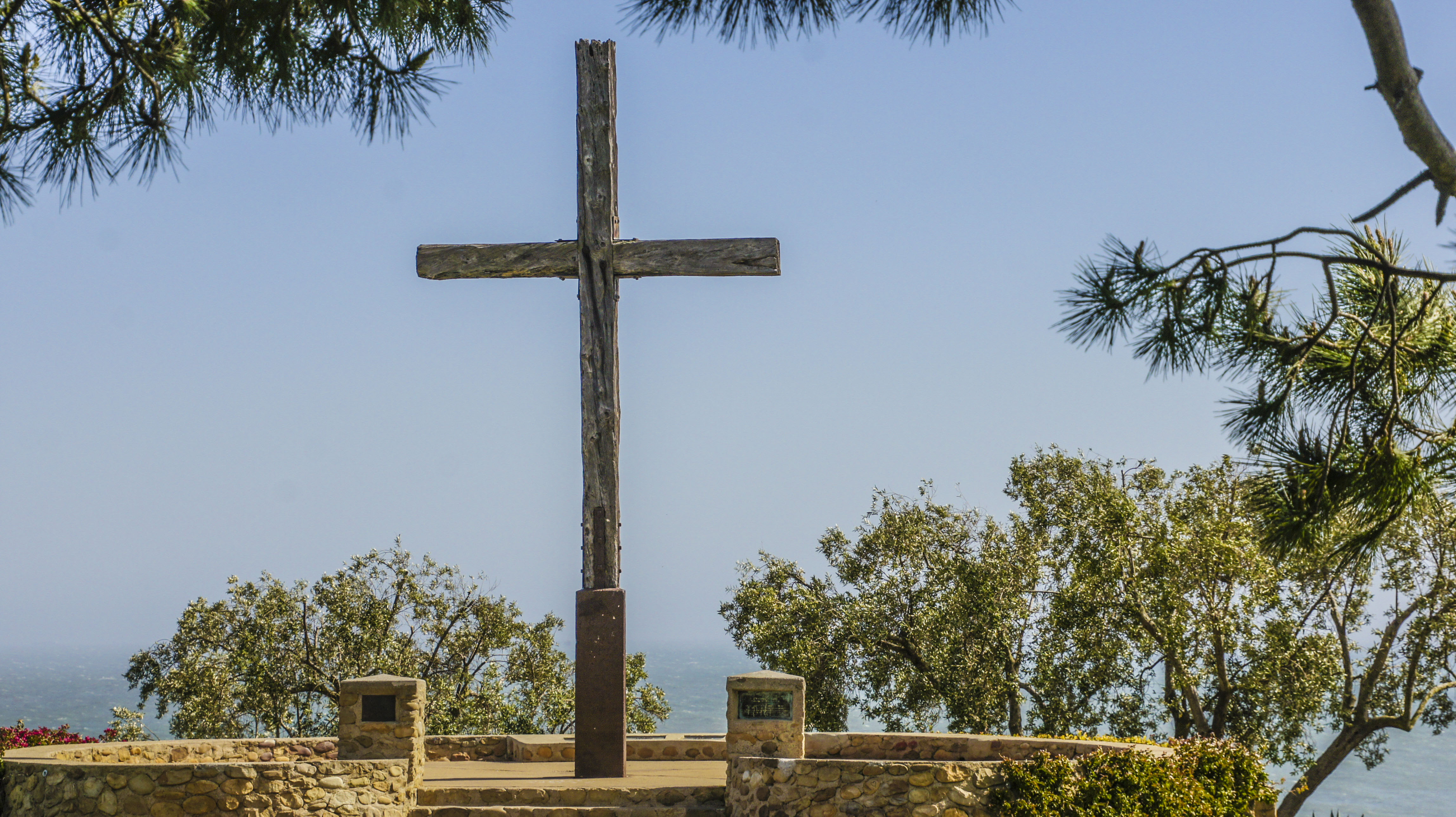
Wooden cross, overlooking Pacific

== See also ==
- Spanish missions in California
- List of Spanish missions in California
- List of Catholic basilicas
- San Buenaventura Mission Aqueduct – carried the water about 7 miles (11 km) to serve the mission compound.
- San Miguel Chapel Site – location of the first outpost and center of operations while the first Mission was being constructed nearby.
- USNS Mission Buenaventura (AO-111) – the lead ship in a Class of fleet oilers built during World War II.
- City of Ventura Historic Landmarks and Districts
