= San Buenaventura Mission Aqueduct =

- U.S. National Register of Historic Places
- California Historical Landmark
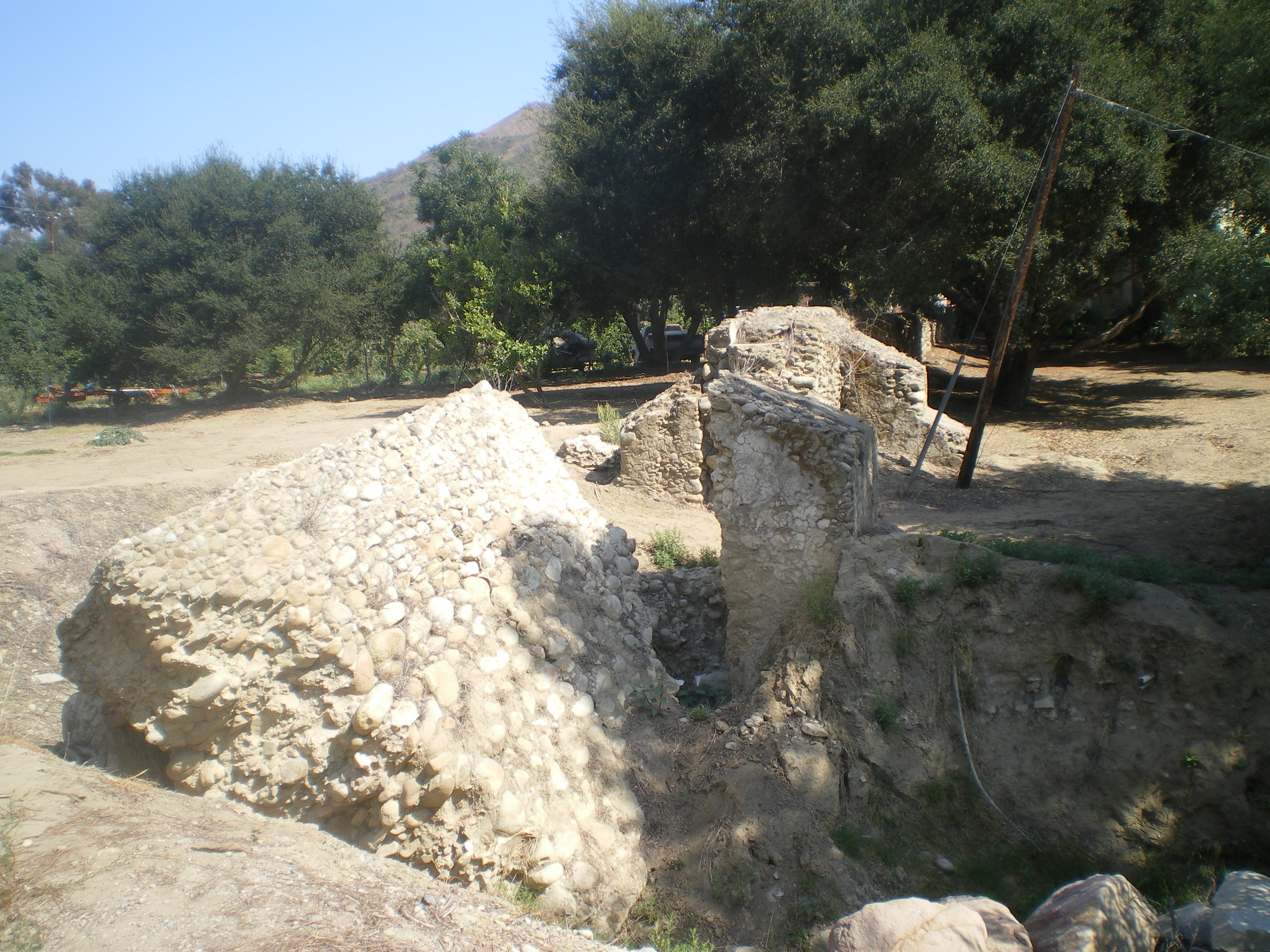
- Remains of San Buenaventura Mission Aqueduct

- Location within California Location within the United States
- Location: 234 Canada Larga Rd., Ventura, California
- Coordinates: 34°20′31″N 119°17′23″W
- Built: 1794
- NRHP reference No.: 75000497
- CHISL No.: 114-1

Significant dates
- Added to NRHP: March 7, 1975
- Designated CHISL: 1985

The San Buenaventura Mission Aqueduct was a seven-mile long, stone and mortar aqueduct built in the late 18th and/or early 19th century to transport water from the Ventura River to the Mission San Buenaventura in Ventura, California.

Accounts vary greatly as to when the aqueduct was built. One account indicates it was built between 1780 and 1790 by the Chumash Indians under the direction of a Spanish priest trained in hydrology. Others place its construction in the 1790s, and yet another indicates it was built between 1805 and 1815 by stonemasons brought from Mexico.

The aqueduct supplied water for the residents of Mission San Buenaventura and irrigation for the mission's pasture and agricultural lands. Water from the aqueduct helped the mission flourish.

Few vestiges of it remain today. Large sections were destroyed in the Great Flood of 1862, and settlers used stones from the old aqueduct to build homes. The combined effects of floods, land cultivation, neglect and land development reduced most of the aqueduct to rubble. The only significant section that remains is located at the mouth of Canyada canyon on land that was formerly known as Rancho Cañada Larga o Verde owned by the Canet family from 1873 until at least the 1960s. This remaining section is 100 feet long and ten feet high, and is believed to have "served as a siphon, drawing water uphill through conduits." The location is at 234 Canada Larga Road near the road's interchange with the Ojai Freeway.

In the early 1970s, the Ventura County Cultural Heritage Commission led a fight to preserve the remaining piece, declaring it a county landmark in 1972. The following year, county supervisors voted to purchase the site. In 1975, the aqueduct site was added to the National Register of Historic Places, and in 1977 the aqueduct site was fenced off to protect it from vandalism. It was also recognized as a California Historical Landmark in 1985.

A controversy arose in 1989 when a newly discovered three-foot section of the aqueduct was demolished during construction of a house. The Ventura County Cultural Heritage Board sought to prevent further demolition, and the owner built his home over the aqueduct, preserving a 20-foot-long section in his basement.

In recent years, preservationists have raised concerns about the failure of the county to take action to protect the remaining section of the aqueduct on Canada Larga Road. In 1998, the Los Angeles Times wrote that "the lone surviving significant chunk of what was once the seven-mile San Buenaventura Mission Aqueduct sits forlornly in a weed-filled corner of an orchard near a freeway offramp north of the city." Though the site is owned by the county, and the head of the county's Cultural Heritage Board called it "an engineering marvel" in sore need of preservation, the county has lacked funds, and the effects of El Nino rains continued the deterioration of the aqueduct.

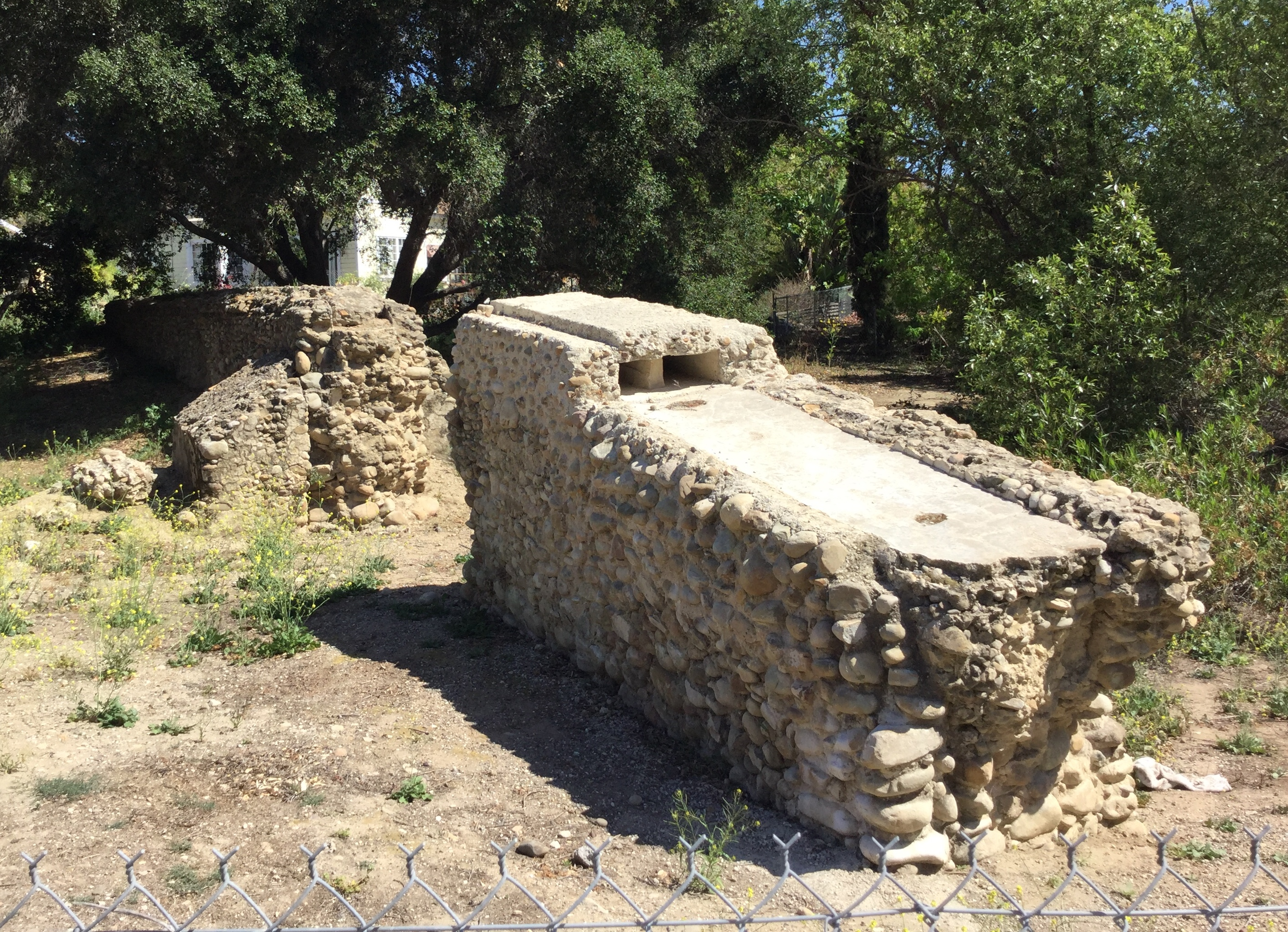

== See also ==
- List of Registered Historic Places in Ventura County, California
- Ventura County Historic Landmarks & Points of Interest
