= 'olołkoy Beach Park =

Public park in California, United States

'olol'koy Beach Park
- formerly Oxnard State Beach and Oxnard Beach Park
- Location within California Location within the United States
- Interactive map of 'olol'koy Beach Park
- Location: 1601 South Harbor Boulevard, Oxnard, California, U.S.
- Coordinates: 34°10′57″N 119°14′13″W
- Area: 62 acres (25 ha)
- Created: 1989; 37 years ago
- Operator: City of Oxnard
- GNIS feature ID: 1871139

'olol'koy Beach Park (or 'olołkoy Beach Park) is a recreational area operated by the city of Oxnard, California at the edge of the Oxnard Plain. Formerly called Oxnard Beach Park, the park was renamed after the Chumashan word for dolphin in 2023.

== Description ==
The park is located along the California Coastal Trail and the Pacific Coast Bicycle Route. The park includes palm tree-lined pathways and a walkway connecting the communities of Oxnard Shores and Channel Islands Beach. An additional walkway connects the park to Channel Islands Harbor. 'olol'koy Beach Park includes two barbecue areas with a capacity of 200 occupants, each with a public sink, table, and a large grill. The main park areas of green grass is separated from the white sand beach by some of the few natural dunes left along the edge of the Oxnard Plain. Activities include beachcombing, walking, and ocean swimming.

== History ==
Jean Harris persuaded city of Oxnard leaders to adopt a grand vision in the creation of this park. The State of California initially purchased a 26-acre (11 ha) site for the park in 1979, with the additional intent to protect the sand dunes within the beach lands.

The developer of an adjacent residential with a hotel site dedicated an additional 36 acres (15 ha), giving the park its present size of 62 acres (25 ha). With the adoption of an operating agreement between City and State in December 1983, plans were developed for this park that was initially called Oxnard State Beach. The park was transferred to the City of Oxnard in 1998. In 2023, the city council approved renaming the park to 'olol'koy, the Chumashan word for dolphin to honor the original inhabitants of the land.

== Gallery ==
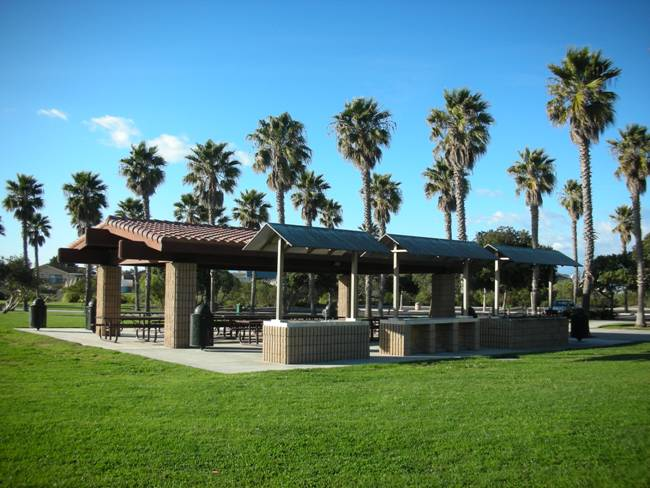
Barbecue area

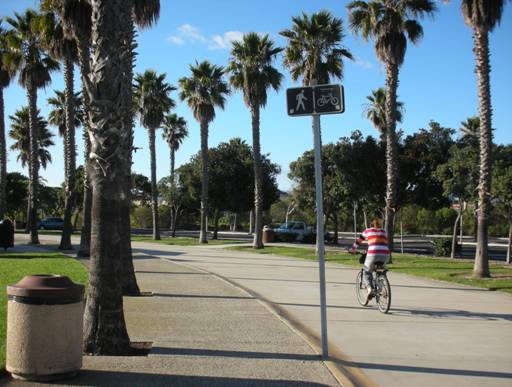
Walkway

== See also ==
- List of beaches in California
- List of California state parks
