= Roma Armbrust =

American conservationist

- Born: September 30, 1927; Los Angeles
- Died: October 10, 2003 (aged 76); Ventura
- Education: UCLA
- Occupations: Teacher; Conservationist
- Known for: Protection of Ormond Beach
- Awards: Volunteer Leadership Award from the Environmental Law Institute

Roma Joy Armbrust (née Sarno, 1927–2003) was an American conservationist and activist. She is best known for her work with Jean Harris to keep Ormond Beach undeveloped.

== Biography ==
She received a bachelor's degree from UCLA in 1948. Armbrust became an elementary school teacher in Los Angeles. She taught for 25 years at Knollwood and Herrick elementary schools. In 1959, Armbrust was part of the San Fernando YMCA "Meadow Maidens" mother-daughter group with her daughter Vikki.

When she retired from teaching, she joined the League of Women Voters and became interested in environmental issues. Armbrust, in partnership with Jean Harris, brought together environmentalists and government officials to ensure the preservation of the undeveloped salt marsh area of Ormond Beach in Oxnard, California. They founded the Ormond Beach Observers in 1989 to lead the wetlands protection initiative. They later continued to work with the city of Oxnard on the Ormond Beach Task Force. Armbrust's activism spanned decades. She was known for her non-confrontational approach to bringing people together.

She was also involved in other volunteer activities including the Ventura County Living Wage Coalition, the Ventura County Open Space District Advisory Committee and the Regional Civic Alliance of Ventura County. She was President of the San Buenaventura Friends of the Library from 1998 to 1999.

In 2003, Armbrust was diagnosed with pancreatic cancer and died a month later, on the same day that the California Coastal Conservancy announced plans to acquire and protect part of the Ormond Beach wetlands.

Armbrust married William (Bill) Armbrust III in 1948. They had two children.

== Awards and honours ==
- 2003 Commendation from the California Legislature Assembly.
- 2003 Commendation from the City of Oxnard City Council.
- 2003 Commendation from the State Coastal Conservancy.
- Commemorative "Roma Armbrust Wetlands Drive" sign on Arnold Road leading to Ormond Beach.
- 2000 Volunteer Leadership Award from the Environmental Law Institute (shared with Jean Harris).
- RA! RA! Awards of the National Women's Political Caucus of Ventura County named in her honour. Armbrust was a founding member.
