= Channel Islands Beach, California =

- Unincorporated community Census-designated place
- Location in Ventura County and the state of California
- Coordinates: 34°9′28″N 119°13′22″W
- Country: United States
- State: California
- County: Ventura

Government
  - State senator: Monique Limón (D)
  - Assemblymember: Steve Bennett (D)
  - U. S. Rep.: Julia Brownley (D)

Area
  - Total: 0.65 sq mi (1.68 km^{2})
  - Land: 0.42 sq mi (1.09 km^{2})
  - Water: 0.22 sq mi (0.58 km^{2}) 1.65%
- Elevation: 6.6 ft (2 m)

Population (2020)
  - Total: 2,870
  - Density: 6,791.1/sq mi (2,622.07/km^{2})
- Time zone: UTC-8 (PST)
  - Summer (DST): UTC-7 (PDT)
- ZIP code: 93035
- Area code: 805
- FIPS code: 06-12669
- GNIS feature IDs: 1867004, 2408010
- Website: https://www.cibcsd.com/

Channel Islands Beach is an unincorporated community in Ventura County, California, United States consisting of three historic neighborhoods: Hollywood Beach, Hollywood by the Sea, and Silver Strand Beach. This densely populated narrow 1.3-mile-long strip (2.1 km) along the coastal edge of the Oxnard Plain was subdivided using the glamor of Hollywood to sell lots in the mid-1920s since the sand dunes had been used for movies. Adjacent development has left this sandy beachfront neighborhood hemmed in by Channel Islands Harbor and Naval Base Ventura County. The harbor mouth separates them into two communities resulting in a round-about travel route around the harbor between them although the Channel Islands Beach Community Services District provides local utilities services to the entire neighborhood. The Special-purpose district has an elected Board of Directors which provides a forum for the unique concerns of the community. Lying immediately adjacent but outside the corporate boundaries of the City of Oxnard and the City of Port Hueneme, they are governed by the county Board of Supervisors.

The population of this residential community was 2,870 at the 2020 census, down from 3,103 at the 2010 census. For statistical purposes, the United States Census Bureau has defined Channel Islands Beach as a census-designated place (CDP).

== Geography ==
The census definition of the area may not correspond to local understanding of the area. This unincorporated coastal community overlooks the Santa Barbara Channel. 'olołkoy Beach Park is immediately upcoast of Hollywood Beach and separates the community from the Oxnard neighborhood of Oxnard Shores. Three subdivision maps created the town lots (from north to south and the year recorded): Hollywood Beach (1924), Hollywood by the Sea (1926), and Silver Strand (1925). The mouth of the harbor was constructed over the shoreline portion of the Hollywood-by-the-Sea subdivision. A few of the lots remained on the north side of the harbor mouth with the intact Hollywood Beach subdivision. Although still unincorporated, this neighborhood is adjacent to the harbor and additional housing, both of which are in the City of Oxnard. The portion of the community on the south side of the mouth is more isolated with only one road providing access to the community. A small portion of the Hollywood-by-the-Sea subdivision touches the shore with a much large portion remaining a distinct tract of homes. The Silver Strand Beach subdivision is along most of the shoreline south of the harbor entrance which is near but without access to the Port of Hueneme.

The area is within the Hueneme School District.

=== Climate ===
This region experiences warm (but not hot) and dry summers, with no average monthly temperatures above 71.6 °F (22.0 °C). According to the Köppen Climate Classification system, Channel Islands Beach has a warm-summer Mediterranean climate, abbreviated "Csb" on climate maps.

== Demographics ==
Historical population
Census	Pop.	Note	%±
1990	3,317		—
2000	3,142		−5.3%
2010	3,103		−1.2%
2020	2,870		−7.5%
U.S. Decennial Census; 1850–1870 1880-1890; 1900 1910 1920; 1930 1940 1950; 1960 1970 1980; 1990 2000 2010

Channel islands beach first appeared as a census designated place in the 2010 U.S. census.

=== 2020 census ===
As of the 2020 census, Channel Islands Beach had a population of 2,870 and a population density of 6,784.9 inhabitants per square mile (2,619.7/km^{2}). The median age was 51.8 years. 12.7% of residents were under the age of 18 and 25.3% of residents were 65 years of age or older. The age distribution was 5.3% aged 18 to 24, 23.9% aged 25 to 44, and 32.8% aged 45 to 64. For every 100 females there were 103.3 males, and for every 100 females age 18 and over there were 105.9 males age 18 and over.

100.0% of residents lived in urban areas, while 0.0% lived in rural areas.

The Census reported that 2,870 people (100% of the population) lived in households. There were 1,332 households, out of which 16.7% had children under the age of 18 living in them. Of all households, 43.2% were married-couple households, 7.2% were cohabiting couple households, 25.2% were households with a male householder and no spouse or partner present, and 24.5% were households with a female householder and no spouse or partner present. About 29.2% of all households were made up of individuals and 12.6% had someone living alone who was 65 years of age or older. The average household size was 2.15. There were 776 families (58.3% of all households).

There were 1,905 housing units at an average density of 4,503.5 units per square mile (1,738.8 units/km^{2}), of which 1,332 (69.9%) were occupied and 30.1% were vacant. Of occupied units, 56.0% were owner-occupied and 44.0% were occupied by renters. The homeowner vacancy rate was 2.0% and the rental vacancy rate was 8.1%.

Racial composition as of the 2020 census
Race	Number	Percent
White	2,224	77.5%
Black or African American	21	0.7%
American Indian and Alaska Native	21	0.7%
Asian	95	3.3%
Native Hawaiian and Other Pacific Islander	7	0.2%
Some other race	137	4.8%
Two or more races	365	12.7%
Hispanic or Latino (of any race)	455	15.9%

=== Income and poverty ===
In 2023, the US Census Bureau estimated that the median household income was $103,219, and the per capita income was $81,232. About 3.5% of families and 5.1% of the population were below the poverty line.

=== 2010 census ===
The 2010 United States census reported that Channel Islands Beach had a population of 3,103. The population density was 7,556.9 inhabitants per square mile (2,917.7/km^{2}). The racial makeup of Channel Islands Beach was 2,712 (87.4%) White, 27 (0.9%) African American, 16 (0.5%) Native American, 108 (3.5%) Asian, 6 (0.2%) Pacific Islander, 103 (3.3%) from other races, and 131 (4.2%) from two or more races. Hispanic or Latino of any race were 402 persons (13.0%).

The Census reported that 3,103 people (100% of the population) lived in households, 0 (0%) lived in non-institutionalized group quarters, and 0 (0%) were institutionalized.

There were 1,352 households, out of which 318 (23.5%) had children under the age of 18 living in them, 609 (45.0%) were opposite-sex married couples living together, 112 (8.3%) had a female householder with no husband present, 84 (6.2%) had a male householder with no wife present. There were 112 (8.3%) unmarried opposite-sex partnerships, and 15 (1.1%) same-sex married couples or partnerships. 363 households (26.8%) were made up of individuals, and 105 (7.8%) had someone living alone who was 65 years of age or older. The average household size was 2.30. There were 805 families (59.5% of all households); the average family size was 2.75.

The population was spread out, with 523 people (16.9%) under the age of 18, 261 people (8.4%) aged 18 to 24, 775 people (25.0%) aged 25 to 44, 1,105 people (35.6%) aged 45 to 64, and 439 people (14.1%) who were 65 years of age or older. The median age was 44.8 years. For every 100 females, there were 111.7 males. For every 100 females age 18 and over, there were 112.9 males.

There were 1,869 housing units at an average density of 4,551.7 units per square mile (1,757.4 units/km^{2}), of which 728 (53.8%) were owner-occupied, and 624 (46.2%) were occupied by renters. The homeowner vacancy rate was 3.4%; the rental vacancy rate was 9.5%. 1,631 people (52.6% of the population) lived in owner-occupied housing units and 1,472 people (47.4%) lived in rental housing units.

== See also ==
- List of beaches in California
