= Jean Harris (environmentalist) =

American environmentalist

Jean Mahoney Harris (May 22, 1922 – November 25, 2008) was an American schoolteacher and environmentalist. She was a member of the Oxnard School Board for nine years, as well as the Vice President of the Oxnard Advisory Group to the City Council. Harris is best known for being the champion of Ormond Beach Wetlands and for fighting to get the City of Oxnard to require the developers to expand on the initial state purchase to create Oxnard Beach Park.

== Life and career ==
Harris was born Jean Mahoney in Mesquite, Texas. Harris and her family moved to California after her father, who was a sports columnist for a newspaper in Texas, was hired as a public relations manager for the Del Mar racetrack, in Del Mar, California. Harris met her husband Ed Harris, an engineer, while in high school and they married when Harris was 18 years old. After marrying, Jean and Ed had three children; Timm, Ellen, and Brian. Harris moved from the San Fernando Valley to Oxnard in the early 1970s. She had a master's degree in Education and was a career schoolteacher and later a school board member for the Oxnard Board of Education for nine years.

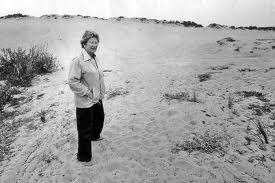
Jean Harris at Ormond Beach

Harris' mentor Roma Armbrust was also her partner in her conservation efforts. In 1983, they formed the Ormond Beach Observers, which unified the voice of a number of diverse organizations interested in protecting these wetlands. They were able to help Oxnard Beach become a State beach, and to conserve the Ormond Beach Wetlands. Harris was quoted in the Vista newspaper in 1980 for wanting to keep Ventura County, especially its coastlines, from becoming another "smoggy, crowded San Fernando Valley". Harris began pushing for the preservation of the Ormond Beach Wetlands in 1979 and she continued to champion for this landscape for more than 30 years. Her work began by organizing hundreds of tours of this rare landscape; Jean stated that she "knew if we took people for a walk on Ormond Beach, and they saw the birds flying, it would sell them on the importance of saving and restoring the wetlands." In 1989 Jean Harris and her counterpart Roma Armbrust, officially began the Ormond Beach Observers to expand these tours on which they would take anyone with interest. Together Jean and Roma monitored development to the surrounding areas ensuring the safety of the wetlands. Harris stated that they fought throughout the years to hold off developers until the Coastal Conservancy and contributors had the resources to help with the preservation of the wetlands. Ormond Beach wetlands are now approximately 1,100 acres with 250 acres still in need of restoration. These wetlands now connect to the Mugu Lagoon wetlands making this area southern California's largest coastal wetlands. The project of restoration and preservation on the edge of the Oxnard Plain continues and is considered by wetland experts to be the most important wetland restoration opportunity in southern California.

In a 2009 interview Dr. Thomas Holden, Mayor of Oxnard said, "Jean's first accomplishment was the Oxnard Beach Park. It started out as a state park – it was a large park of Harbor Boulevard, adjacent to a residential/hotel site. Jean championed the developer to dedicate additional land to what the State had already purchased (62 acres total) to create the park, as it stands today. She was very, very instrumental in this securing the park for the City of Oxnard." In a 2009 interview Dr. Thomas Holden, Mayor of Oxnard said, "Jean's first accomplishment was the Oxnard Beach Park. It started out as a state park – it was a large park of Harbor Boulevard, adjacent to a residential/hotel site. Jean championed the developer to dedicate additional land to what the State had already purchased (62 acres total) to create the park, as it stands today. She was very, very instrumental in this securing the park for the City of Oxnard. The Dedication Ceremony for the beach park was held on Saturday, September 23, 1989. Oxnard State Beach Park has come about as a result of many years of cooperative effort on the part of private citizens, developers, and both local and state governments.

== Oxnard Beach Park ==
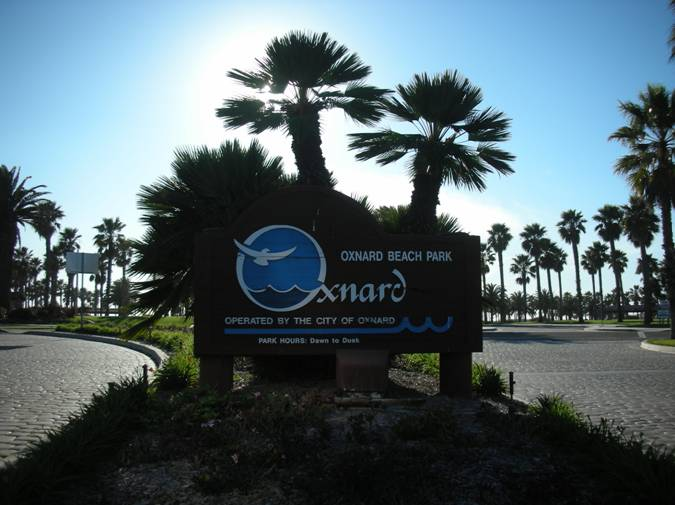
Park entrance sign

Encouraged by interest on the part of area residents, the State of California purchased a 26-acre site (11 ha) for the park in 1979. Jean Harris was able to persuade city leaders to adopt her vision for the park. After the City Council insisted that the developer dedicate much of the land for public use, a lawsuit ensued. It was resolved only after city, county and state officials secured funding to purchase the land from the developer and convert it into Oxnard State Beach Park.

Mandalay Beach Associates, the developer of the residential/hotel site to the south, dedicated an additional 36 acres (15 ha), giving the park its present size of 62 acres (25 ha). Following the adoption of an operating agreement between City and State in December 1983, city staff began planning the design and development of Oxnard State Beach Park early in 1984. By September 1984, the Oxnard State Beach Park General Plan had been developed and approved by the State Parks Commission. In June 1987, the City Council awarded a contract for $1,521,814 to Nye Construction for the Phase I park development –street and parking lot paving, lighting, bicycle and pedestrian walks, beach access trails, grading and utilities—completed in June 1988. In December 1988, Valley Crest was awarded an $854,515 contract for Phase IIA (landscaping, irrigation, picnic units, volleyball area) and in March 1989, Hanson Construction received a $213,277 contract for Phase IIB (two restrooms, one picnic shelter, a gatehouse and kiosk).

The diverse sources of funding for this project included a Federal Land and Water Conservation Grant for this project included a Federal Land and Water Conservation Grant for $381,961, State Bond Acts Funds of $600,000 State Coastal Management Funds of $238,000, City Quimby and Park Development Fund of $1,681,000 and a $100,000 and a $100,000 donation from the Bard Family. The total cost of Oxnard State Beach's development as of September 1989 is approximately $3,000,000. A third phase, consisting of a third restroom building, lifeguard towers, two additional picnic shelters, exercise course, play areas and picnic units, was planned but was not developed. The Dedication Ceremony for the beach park was held on Saturday, September 23, 1989.

== Ormond Beach Wetlands ==
Jean Harris began pushing for the preservation of the Ormond Beach Wetlands in 1979 and she continued to champion for this landscape for more than 30 years. Her work began by organizing hundreds of tours of this rare landscape; Jean stated that she "knew if we took people for a walk on Ormond Beach, and they saw the birds flying, it would sell them on the importance of saving and restoring the wetlands." In 1989 Jean Harris and her counterpart Roma Armbrust, officially began the Ormond Beach Observers to expand these tours on which they would take anyone with interest. Together Jean and Roma monitored development to the surrounding areas ensuring the safety of the wetlands. Harris stated <that they fought throughout the years to hold off developers until the Coastal Conservancy and contributors had the resources to help with the preservation of the wetlands. Ormond Beach wetlands are now approximately 1,100 acres with 250 acres still in need of restoration. These wetlands now connect to the Mugu Lagoon wetlands making this area southern California's largest coastal wetlands. The project of restoration and preservation continues and is considered by wetland experts to be the most important wetland restoration opportunity in southern California.

== Awards and Recognitions ==
Jean Harris was presented a number of awards for the works she did.

Year	Awarding body	Organisation
1979	Oxnard Distinguished Citizen of the Year	Assemblyman Charles R. Imbreichtan Pavely
1983	Certification of Election	Governing Board Member/Oxnard Schools
1983	Certification of Election	Governing Board Member/ Oxnard Schools Board of Trustees
1986	Apprentice Seaman	Brig Pilgrim (ship)
1989	Community Relations Commission Awards	Oxnard City Council
1990	Commendation for Community Service	Board of Supervisor of Ventura County
1991	Board of Governors	Oxnard School District
1994	Appreciation award	LA Pierce College, Natural Resources Management Club
2000	For supporting Coastal Conservancy to acquire 640 acres of Wetlands	Board of Supervisors of VC
2005	For preservation and protection efforts of Ormond Beach	State Sen. Sheila Kuehl
2005	For preservation and protection efforts of Ormond Beach	Coastal Conservancy
2005	In recognition of Jean Harris and Roma Armbrust	Colleagues
2005	Special Congressional Recognition	Hon. Lois Capps
2007	In recognition of Saviers Rd design team for effort to acquire Ormond Beach Wetlands	Board of Supervisors of VC

In her memory, California State University Channel Islands held a dedication to the Jean Harris Local Environmental Collection on February 2, 2010 at the John Spoor Broome Library and the CI Environmental Science & Resource Management Program. This dedication celebrates the hard work and devotion in Harris' life as an educator and activist. Also celebrated was the importance of her collection and campaign for Ormond Beach Wetlands Restoration Project to the university.
