= Ormond Beach, Oxnard, California =

Region of Oxnard, California, United States

Coordinates: 34.137°N 119.170°W

Ormond Beach is an industrial region of the city of Oxnard in Ventura County, Southern California. It's situated southeast of the neighboring community of Port Hueneme and extends southeast to Naval Air Station Point Mugu.

== History ==
Native Americans lived in the area and made use of the wetlands and lagoon, most notably the Chumash people, up until the early 1800s. Settlers from Europe began developing agricultural fields on the Oxnard plain in the 1840s as well as a commercial shipping wharf at Hueneme in 1874. Commercial and sport fishing began at Mugu Lagoon in the 1930s and after WWII, the area rapidly became more developed.

== Recreation ==
Ormond Beach is often used for surfing, birding, and walking. The average water temperature is about 55-59 degrees Fahrenheit from December to May and 60-63 Fahrenheit from June to November. Fishing in the area is permitted and several species of fish can be caught including perch, croakers, halibut, as well as other bottomfish such as banjo rays, shovel nose sharks, and skates.

== Environmental issues ==
The Ormond Beach area hosts over 200 migratory bird species and more shorebird species are known to use Ormond Beach than any other site in Ventura County. Among these 200 species, are two endangered species, in which protection and recovery are crucial to the survival of the species. The Western Snowy Plover and The California Least Tern are both native to the Pacific Coast, creating nesting sites up and down the coast of California and Mexico. Each year from spring to autumn, the dunes at Ormond Beach near Oxnard are encircled with bright orange mesh to create a nursery for endangered California Least Terns and Western Snowy Plovers. October 2006 was the most successful nesting season at Ormond Beach in several years with 24 hatched plovers and 44 fledged least terns.

South Ormond Beach is a part of a much larger wetland area. In 2003, the Western Alliance for Nature agreed to make the Ormond Beach Project a primary focus of work for the organization. On January 26, 2010, the Ventura County Democratic Central Committee passed a “Resolution to Preserve, Protect and Restore the Ormond Beach Wetlands of Oxnard California.”

In 1999, the California Coastal Conservancy attempted to buy approximately 660 acres of wetlands at Ormond Beach from Southern California Edison. After a couple years of negotiating, a setback came in the form of Occidental Petroleum, a different buyer who wanted to turn the site into a liquefied natural gas (LNG) terminal. By May 31, 2002, the last day the purchase was still available; citizens and leaders of Oxnard rallied and passed the decision securing 265 acres of wetland, simultaneously preventing the LNG terminal from being constructed. The California Coastal Conservancy plans to restore the historical wetland and increase the size of the protected area.
