= Channel Islands Harbor =

Small craft harbor in Oxnard, California

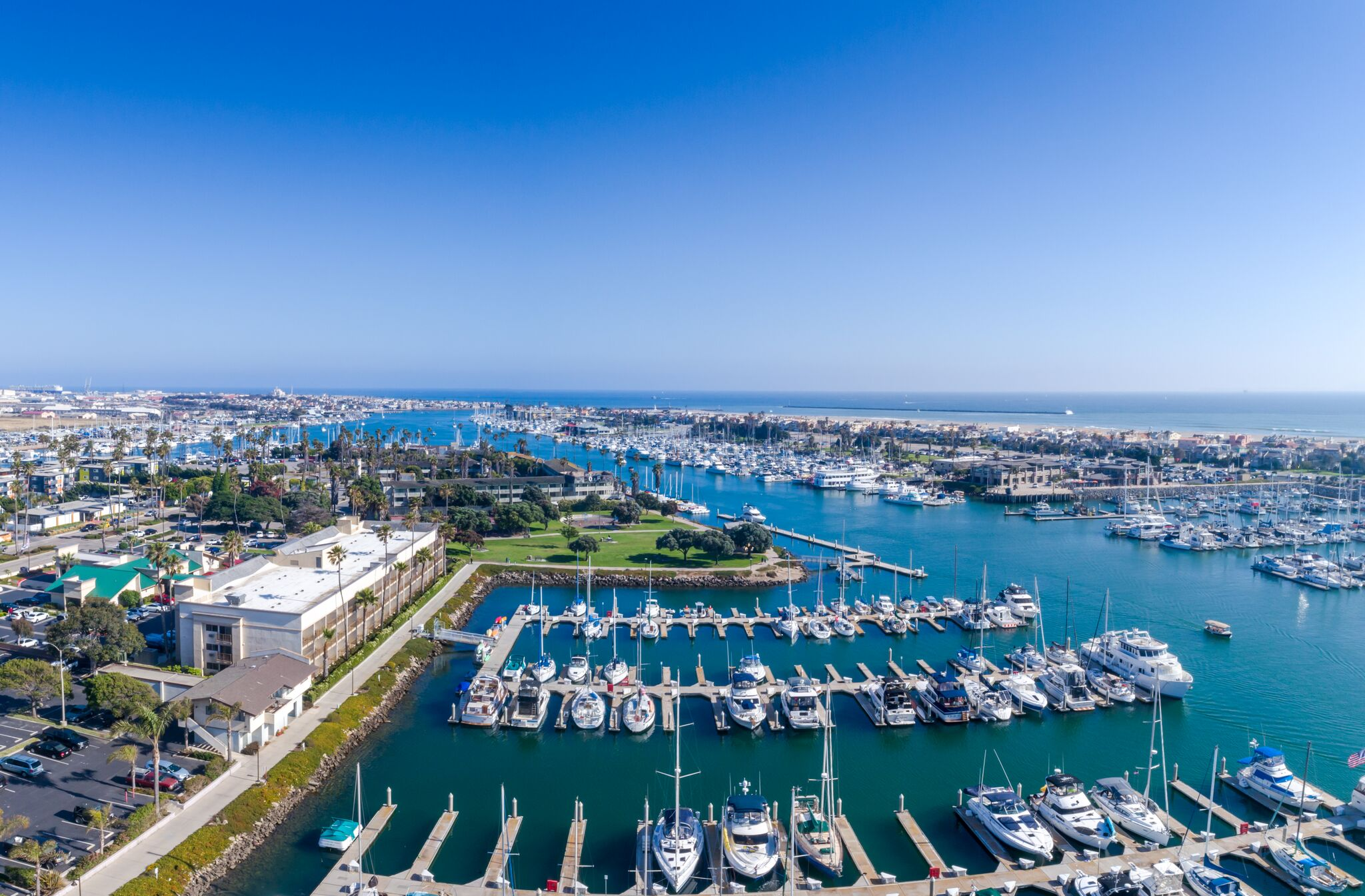
- Scene from commercial fishing boat unloading pier facing southeast with hotel in background
- Interactive map of Channel Islands Harbor

Location
- Country: United States
- Location: Oxnard, California
- Coordinates: 34°10′12″N 119°13′30″W

Details
- Opened: 1960; 66 years ago
- Owned by: County of Ventura
- Type of harbour: Artificial
- Size of harbour: 166 acres (67 ha)
- Land area: 126 acres (51 ha)
- No. of berths: 2,150

Statistics
- Website channelislandsharbor.org

Channel Islands Harbor is a small craft harbor and shore-protection project in Oxnard, California, at the southern end of the Santa Barbara Channel. It is the fifth largest harbor for small-craft recreation in the state of California and is a waterfront resort, recreation, and dining marketplace. Recreational activities include diving, boat charters, sea kayaking, sportfishing, and whale watching (gray whales January through early April; blue and humpback whales July to September).

The horseshoe shaped harbor contains 166 acres (0.67 km^{2}) of water surrounded by 126 acres (0.51 km^{2}) of land and supports more than 2,500 vessels, four yacht clubs, and nine full-service marinas. The Channel Islands are a popular destination. Island Packers operates a ferry service out of the harbor that accesses Anacapa Island. The Ventura County Maritime Museum has a regularly rotating exhibit, maritime-themed art, and model ships. Every three years the harbor is host to the Channel Islands Tall Ships Festival which includes between two and five large sailing vessels and draws thousands of visitors.

== History ==
The US Army Corps of Engineers formed the harbor in 1960 by scooping out sand dunes and wetlands at the edge of Oxnard Plain and depositing the surplus sand at the nearby beaches of Port Hueneme. The sand trap at the harbor entrance was designed to retain sand that otherwise might be diverted into the ocean due to the impacts of the construction of the Port of Hueneme. The sand was to be regularly dredged and placed on Hueneme Beach which suffers erosion due to the port blocking the littoral drift of sand.

While the County of Ventura arranged to oversee the harbor and manage it in 1963, they formed an agreement with the City of Oxnard to annex the then vacant county land and provide sewage service, water and utilities. The city built the infrastructure and under the agreement began to receive sales, property and lodging tax revenues. After the annexation agreement between the county and city had expired, the city stopped keeping up the parks, parking lots and restrooms in public areas in 2018. They also were no longer going to pay the water bills for these facilities. Oxnard harbor residents also elected to end payments to harbor patrol which ended an annual revenue stream. The Mandalay Generating Station closed in 2018 which circulated water as part of the power plant's cooling process.

== Operation and facilities ==
Ventura County Harbor Department patrols the main harbor which is south of the Channel Islands Boulevard bridges. The city of Oxnard maintains the northern neighborhood waterways.

The harbor is part of Ocean Resources Enhancement and Hatchery Program.

== Neighborhood and destinations ==
The harbor waters connect to the north with Mandalay Bay, a residential waterfront development built in 1972 consisting of over 700 boat dock homes. Additional developments expanded the Harbor in the 2000s. The development consists of single-family homes and townhouses with reinforced concrete bulkheads lining a series of short navigable canal-like waterways. Between 1950 and 1981 Mandalay Bay was a permitted oil field waste disposal site which caused the release of numerous hazardous chemicals. The records of what was dumped were subsequently lost, resulting in calls for an investigation and millions of dollars in lawsuits from home buyers who were told the area was safe for habitation.

The Channel Islands Boating Center opened in 2013. Great blue herons and white egrets nest in trees around the harbor.

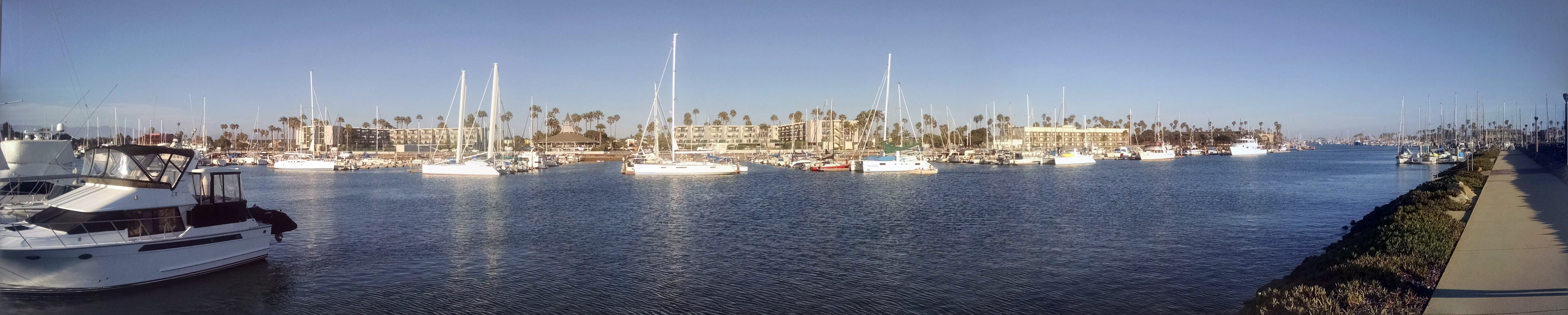
Channel Islands Harbor from west side looking east in the late afternoon towards peninsula in center of harbor.
