= Oxnard, California =

- City
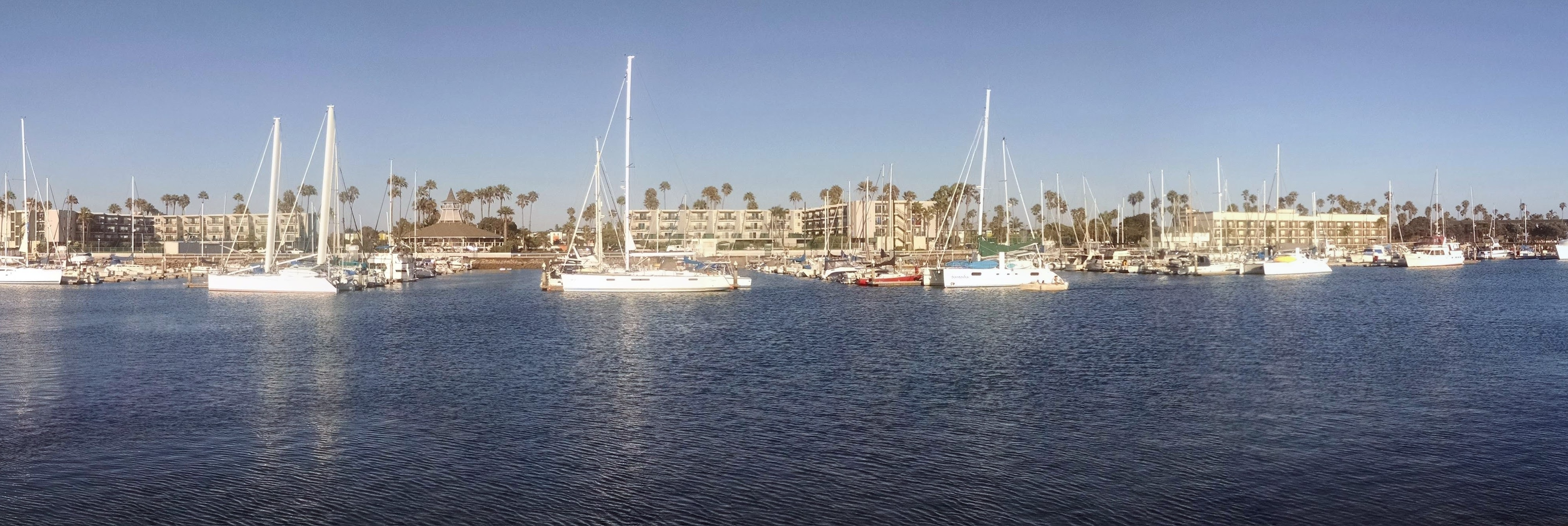
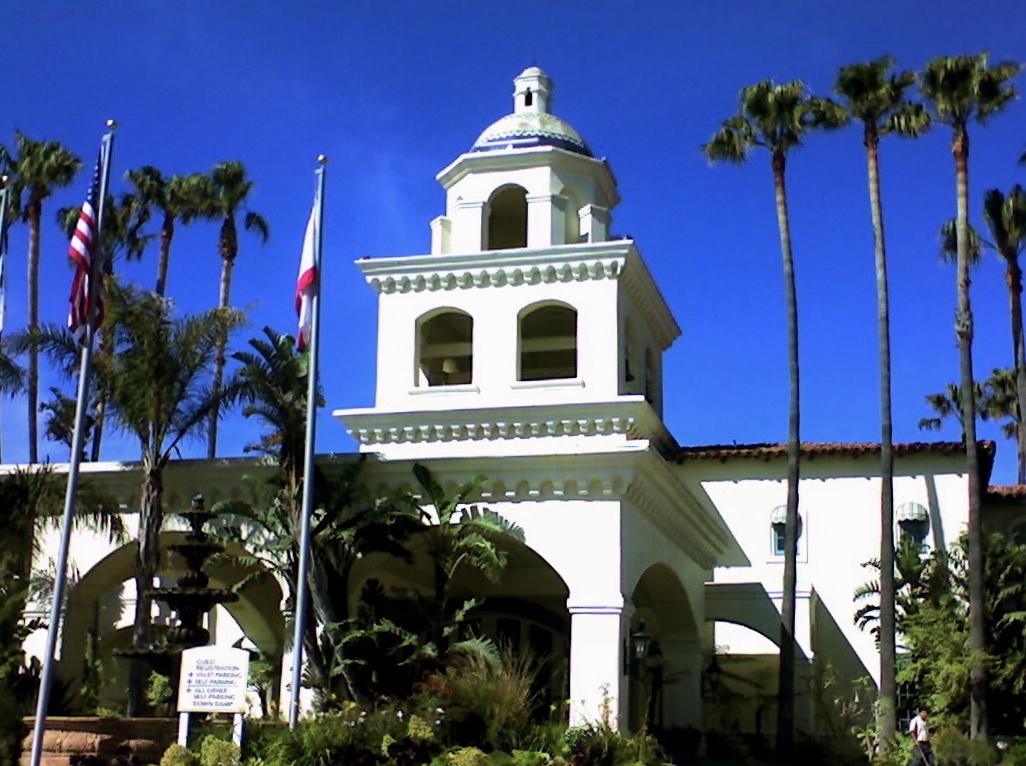
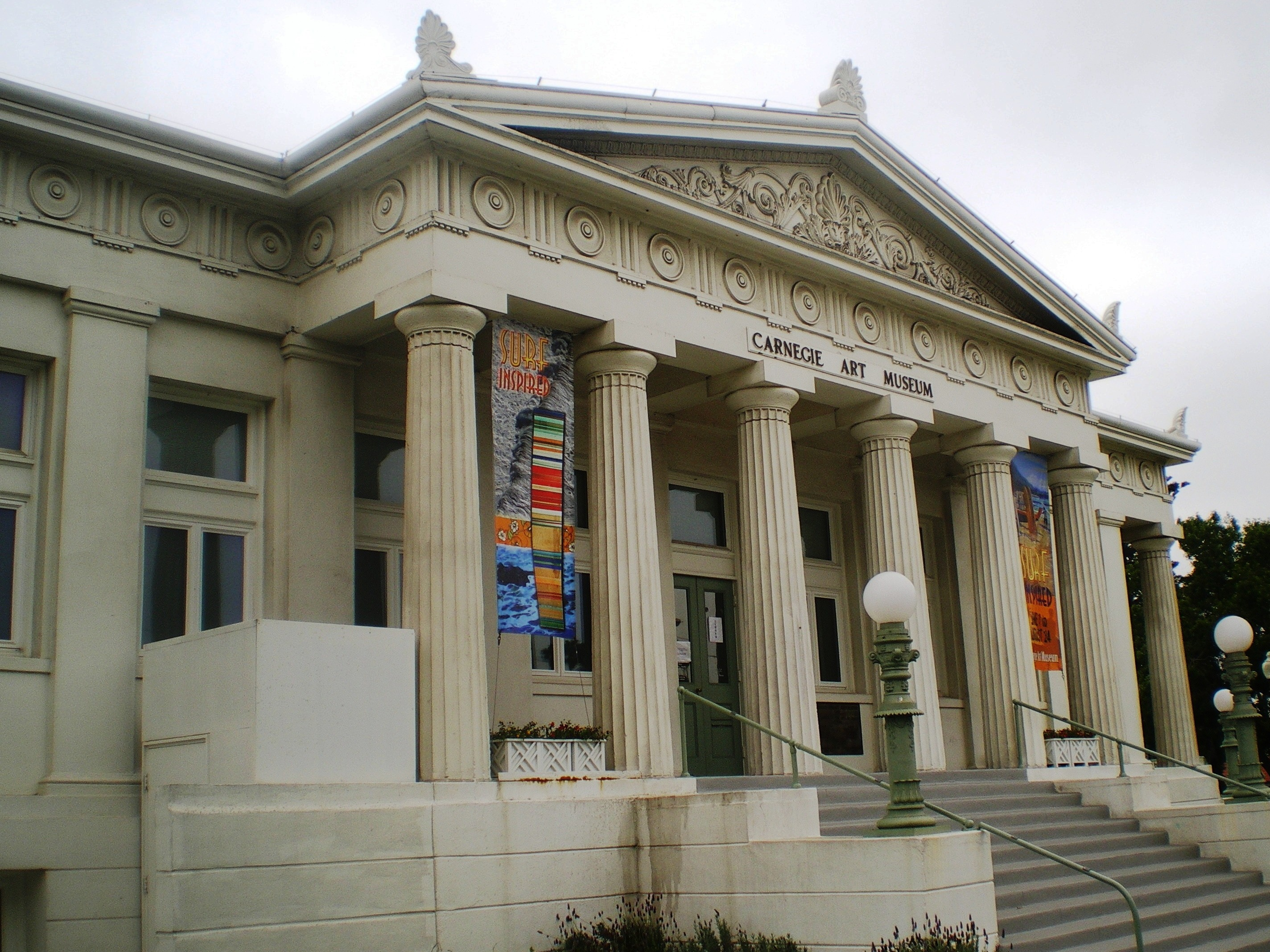
- Clockwise: Channel Islands Harbor; Carnegie Art Museum; hotel at the beach

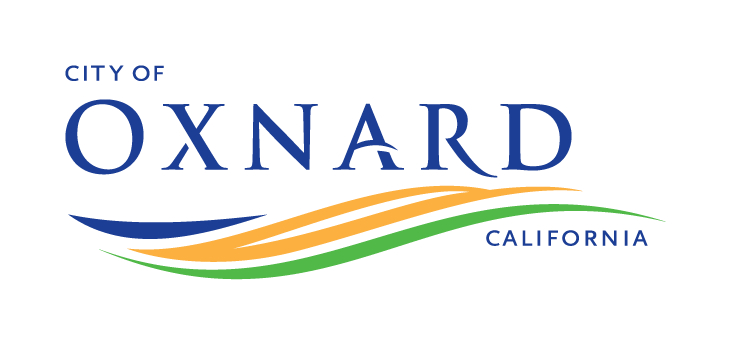
- Logo
- Nicknames: Gateway to the Channel Islands, The Nard
- Interactive map of Oxnard, California
- Location in the United States Oxnard (the United States)
- Coordinates: 34°11′29″N 119°10′57″W
- Country: United States
- State: California
- County: Ventura
- Region: Oxnard Plain
- Incorporated: June 30, 1903
- Named for: Henry T. Oxnard

Government
  - Type: Council–manager
  - Mayor: Luis McArthur
  - Mayor Pro Tempore: Gabe Teran
  - City council: Gabriela Basua; Bert Perello; Michaela Perez; Gabriela Rodriguez; Aaron Starr
  - City treasurer: Phil Molina
  - City clerk: Luly Lopez
  - City manager: Alexander Nguyen

Area
  - City: 39.14 sq mi (101.38 km^{2})
  - Land: 26.53 sq mi (68.70 km^{2})
  - Water: 12.62 sq mi (32.68 km^{2}) 31.41%
- Elevation: 52 ft (16 m)

Population (2020)
  - City: 202,063
  - Rank: 1st in Ventura County; 22nd in California; 127th in the United States
  - Density: 7,616.4/sq mi (2,940.7/km^{2})
  - Urban: 376,117 (US: 109th)
  - Urban density: 4,910/sq mi (1,895.6/km^{2})
  - Metro: 843,843 (US: 71st)
- Time zone: UTC−8 (Pacific)
  - Summer (DST): UTC−7 (PDT)
- ZIP Codes: 93030–93036
- Area codes: 805 and 820
- FIPS code: 06-54652
- GNIS feature IDs: 1652766, 2411347
- Website: oxnard.gov

Oxnard (/ˈɒksnɑːrd/) is a city in Ventura County, California, United States. On California's Central Coast, it is the most populous city in Ventura County and the 22nd-most-populous city in California. Incorporated in 1903, Oxnard lies approximately 60 miles (97 km) northwest of downtown Los Angeles.

It is at the western edge of the fertile Oxnard Plain, adjacent to agricultural fields with strawberries, lima beans and other vegetable crops. Oxnard is also a major transportation hub in Southern California, with Amtrak, Union Pacific, Metrolink, Greyhound, and Intercalifornias stopping there. It also has a small regional airport, Oxnard Airport (OXR). The town also has significant connections to the nearby oil fields Oxnard Oil Field and the West Montalvo Oil Field. The high density of oil, industry, and agricultural activities around the city has led to several environmental issues.

Oxnard's population was 202,063 in 2020, and is largely Latino. It is the most populous city in the Oxnard–Thousand Oaks–Ventura, CA Metropolitan Statistical Area.

== History ==
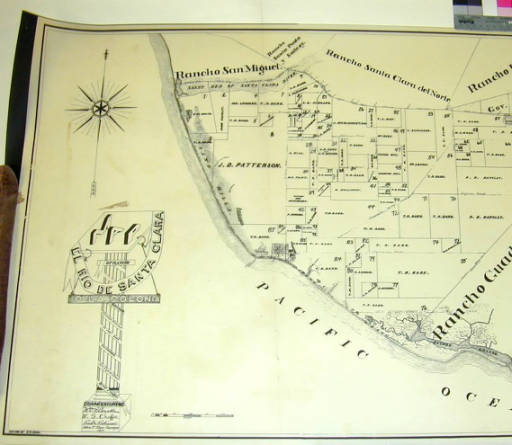
Oxnard was originally a part of Rancho El Rio de Santa Clara o la Colonia, granted in 1837 by Governor Alvarado to seven retired soldiers from the Presidio of Santa Barbara.

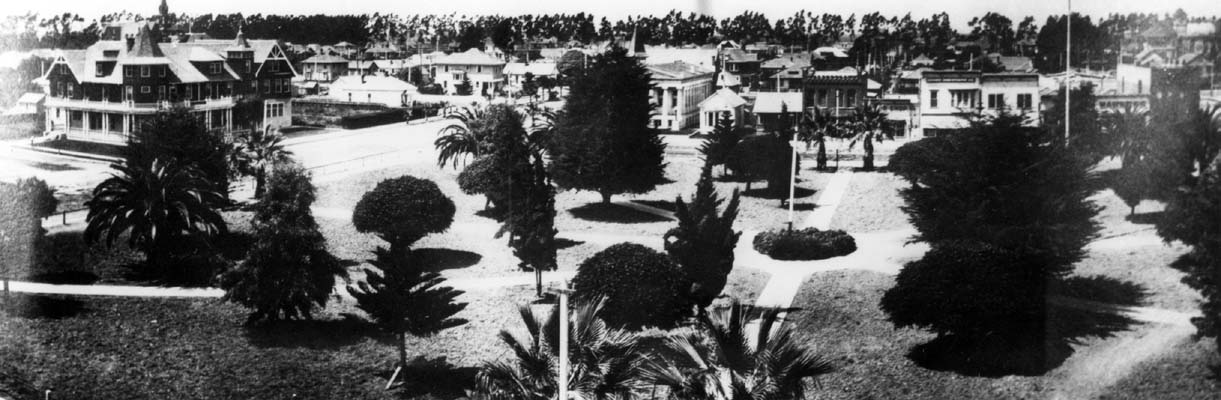
Downtown Oxnard, early 1900s

Before the arrival of Europeans, the area was inhabited by Chumash Native Americans. The first European to encounter the area was explorer João Rodrigues Cabrilho, who claimed it for Spain in 1542. During the mission period, Mission San Buenaventura, established in 1782, used the area for raising cattle.

Ranching began to take hold among Californio settlers, who lost their regional influence when California became a US state in 1850. At about the same time, the area was settled by American farmers, who cultivated barley and lima beans.

Henry T. Oxnard, founder of Moorhead, Minnesota-based American Crystal Sugar Company who operated a successful sugar beet factory with his three brothers (Benjamin, James, and Robert) in Chino, California, was enticed to build a $2 million factory on the plain inland from Port Hueneme. Shortly after the 1897 beet campaign, a new town emerged. Oxnard intended to name the settlement after the Greek word for "sugar", zachari, but frustrated by bureaucracy, named it after himself. Given the potential growth of Oxnard, in the spring of 1898, a railroad station was built to service the plant, attracting a population of Chinese, Japanese, and Mexican laborers. The Oxnard brothers, who never lived in their namesake city, sold the Chino and the giant red-brick Oxnard factory in 1899 for nearly $4 million. The Oxnard factory, with its landmark twin smokestacks, operated from August 19, 1899, until October 26, 1959. Factory operations were interrupted in the 1903 Oxnard strike.

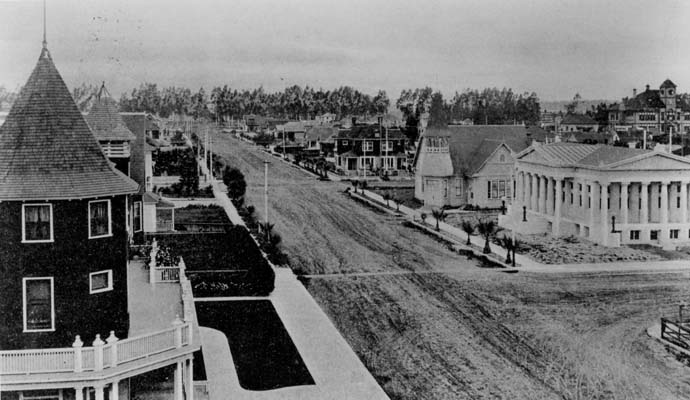
Oxnard, 1908. The public library is at the right.

Oxnard was incorporated as a California city on June 30, 1903, and the public library was opened in 1907. A neighborhood of distinctive homes, established in 1909, has been placed on the National Register of Historic Places as the Henry T. Oxnard Historic District. Before and during World War II, the naval bases of Point Mugu and Port Hueneme were established in the area to take advantage of the only major navigable port on California's coast between the Port of Los Angeles and San Francisco Bay, and the bases in turn encouraged the development of the defense-based aerospace and communications industries.

In the mid-20th century, Oxnard grew and developed the areas outside the downtown area, including homes, industry, retail, and a new harbor named Channel Islands Harbor. Martin V. ("Bud") Smith (1916–2001) became an influential developer. Smith's first enterprise in 1941 was the Colonial House Restaurant (demolished 1988) and then the Wagon Wheel Junction in 1947 (demolished 2011). He was also involved in the development of the high-rise towers at the Topa Financial Plaza, the Channel Islands Harbor, Casa Sirena Resort, the Esplanade Shopping Mall, Fisherman's Wharf, the Carriage Square Shopping Center, the Maritime Museum, and many other hotel, restaurant and retail projects. In the late 1970s, as the demographic shifted towards becoming a majority-Latino city, the Ku Klux Klan, which historically had a weak presence in Ventura County, unsuccessfully tried to form a chapter in Oxnard. Also in the 70's, the Oxnard School Board lost a court case, Soria v. Oxnard, aimed at addressing decades of segregationist practices in Oxnard schools.

In June 2004, the Oxnard Police Department and the Ventura County Sheriff imposed a gang injunction over a 6.6-square-mile (17 km^{2}) area of the central district of the city, to restrict gang activity. The injunction was upheld in the Ventura County Superior Court and made a permanent law in 2005. A similar injunction was imposed in September 2006 over a 4.26-square-mile (11.0 km^{2}) area of the south side of the city. Prohibited activities include associating with other known gang members, witness intimidation, possessing firearms or using gang gestures. Since then, court decisions have made adding people to the civil orders more stringent, stemming from lawsuits in Los Angeles and Orange counties. Judges determined that it was unconstitutional for people to be added to a gang injunction without a due process hearing. As a result of budget cuts due to the COVID-19 pandemic, the Oxnard police stopped maintaining and enforcing the injunction in 2020.

== Geography ==
Oxnard is located on the Oxnard Plain, an area with fertile soil. With its beaches, dunes, wetlands, creeks, and the Santa Clara River, the area contains several critical biological communities. Native plant communities include: coastal sage scrub, California Annual Grassland, and Coastal Dune Scrub species; however, most native plants have been eliminated from within the city limits to make way for agriculture and urban and industrial development. Also native to the region is the endangered Ventura Marsh Milkvetch, and the last self-sustaining population is in Oxnard in the center of an approved housing development.

=== Rivers ===
The Santa Clara River separates Oxnard and Ventura. Tributaries to this river include Sespe Creek, Piru Creek, and Castaic Creek.

=== Geology ===
Oxnard is on a tectonically active plate since most of Coastal California is near the boundaries between the Pacific and North American Plates. The San Andreas Fault, which demarcates this boundary, is about 40 miles away.

One active fault that transverses Oxnard is the Oak Ridge Fault, which straddles the Santa Clara River Valley westward from the Santa Susana Mountains, crosses the Oxnard Plain through Oxnard, and extends into the Santa Barbara Channel. The coastline is subject to inundation by a tsunami up to 23 feet in height.

The fault has significantly contributed to seismic activity in the Oxnard region and beyond. The January 17, 1994, 6.7 M_{w} Northridge earthquake is believed to have occurred in the Santa Clarita extension of the Oak Ridge Fault. Landslides and ridge-top shattering resulting from the Northridge earthquake were observed above Moorpark, a city 19.6 mi (31.5 km) east of Oxnard.

=== Climate ===
Oxnard is the location of the National Weather Service forecast office that serves the Los Angeles area. The city is situated in a Mediterranean (dry subtropical) climate zone, experiencing mild and relatively wet winters, and warm, dry summers, in a climate called the warm-summer Mediterranean climate. Onshore breezes keep the communities of Oxnard cooler in summer and warmer in winter than those further inland. The average mean temperature is 61 °F (16 °C). The average minimum temperature is 52 °F (11 °C) and the average maximum temperature is 69 °F (21 °C). Generally, the weather is mild and dry, with around 300 days of sunshine annually. The average annual precipitation is 15.62 in (397 mm).

Climate data for Oxnard, California (Oxnard Airport), 1991–2020 normals, extremes 1923–present
Month	Jan	Feb	Mar	Apr	May	Jun	Jul	Aug	Sep	Oct	Nov	Dec	Year
Record high °F (°C)	94 (34)	91 (33)	94 (34)	100 (38)	98 (37)	102 (39)	96 (36)	97 (36)	105 (41)	104 (40)	98 (37)	96 (36)	105 (41)
Mean maximum °F (°C)	81.7 (27.6)	80.8 (27.1)	82.7 (28.2)	85.3 (29.6)	80.6 (27.0)	80.3 (26.8)	83.0 (28.3)	84.1 (28.9)	87.6 (30.9)	92.3 (33.5)	86.6 (30.3)	79.6 (26.4)	94.8 (34.9)
Mean daily maximum °F (°C)	65.9 (18.8)	65.4 (18.6)	65.6 (18.7)	66.6 (19.2)	68.0 (20.0)	69.5 (20.8)	72.9 (22.7)	73.5 (23.1)	73.5 (23.1)	73.5 (23.1)	70.0 (21.1)	65.9 (18.8)	69.2 (20.7)
Daily mean °F (°C)	56.0 (13.3)	56.6 (13.7)	57.4 (14.1)	58.5 (14.7)	61.2 (16.2)	63.7 (17.6)	66.7 (19.3)	67.1 (19.5)	66.6 (19.2)	64.5 (18.1)	60.1 (15.6)	56.4 (13.6)	61.2 (16.2)
Mean daily minimum °F (°C)	46.1 (7.8)	47.7 (8.7)	49.3 (9.6)	50.5 (10.3)	54.3 (12.4)	57.9 (14.4)	60.6 (15.9)	60.6 (15.9)	59.7 (15.4)	55.4 (13.0)	50.1 (10.1)	46.9 (8.3)	53.3 (11.8)
Mean minimum °F (°C)	37.8 (3.2)	38.4 (3.6)	40.4 (4.7)	43.1 (6.2)	47.4 (8.6)	50.8 (10.4)	54.5 (12.5)	54.5 (12.5)	52.6 (11.4)	47.7 (8.7)	41.6 (5.3)	37.4 (3.0)	35.8 (2.1)
Record low °F (°C)	26 (−3)	28 (−2)	31 (−1)	31 (−1)	34 (1)	37 (3)	42 (6)	43 (6)	40 (4)	35 (2)	28 (−2)	28 (−2)	26 (−3)
Average precipitation inches (mm)	2.92 (74)	3.26 (83)	2.30 (58)	0.69 (18)	0.34 (8.6)	0.06 (1.5)	0.02 (0.51)	0.01 (0.25)	0.08 (2.0)	0.46 (12)	0.71 (18)	2.08 (53)	12.93 (328.86)
Average precipitation days (≥ 0.01 in)	5.9	6.6	5.6	3.7	2.3	1.1	0.8	0.9	2.3	4.5	4.6	5.7	44.0
Source 1: NOAA
Source 2: National Weather Service

=== Wildlife and ecology ===
The area contains several critical biological communities. Native plant communities include coastal sage scrub, California Annual Grassland, and Coastal Dune Scrub species; most native plants have been eliminated from within the city limits to make way for development. Also native to the region is the endangered Ventura Marsh Milkvetch, with the last self-sustaining population in Oxnard being at the center of a housing development.

The balance of wildlife in Oxnard is similar to most places in southern California, with small mammals being common in urbanized areas, like squirrels, raccoons, and skunks. Coyotes prey on these smaller mammals. Small birds and mammals can be food for stray, feral, and pet dogs and cats.

=== Environmental issues ===
Oxnard has more coastal power plants than any other city in California, with three fossil-fuel power plants providing energy for cities in both Ventura and Santa Barbara Counties. The California Environmental Protection Agency (CalEPA) has identified Oxnard as a city excessively burdened by multiple sources of pollution. Two of the power plants use ocean water cooling. The Office of Environmental Health Hazard Assessment (OEHHA) has categorized much of Oxnard in the top 10 percent of ZIP codes most negatively impacted by pollution in the state. In May 2015, the Oxnard City Council unanimously voted to extend the city moratorium on power plant construction. This moratorium extension occurred due to NRG/Southern California Edison's proposal, also called the Puente Power Project, to construct a new fossil-fuel power plant. The following day, an NRG representative stated their case to replace the old power generation plant at Mandalay Beach with a new, hi-tech, much cleaner, and more efficient plant.

Pesticides are used in the agricultural fields surrounding Oxnard, as the area is one of the nation's leading strawberry producers, with agriculture being one of the top contributors to Oxnard's economy. Strawberries depend on large applications of fumigants containing pesticides. The Center for Health Journalism reported four ZIP codes with the highest pesticide use in the state clustered around Oxnard.

=== Architecture ===
The historical architectural styles of Oxnard ranch family homes are Victorian era, Italian style, and Carpenter Gothic. In the Henry T. Oxnard Historic District, there are five Prairie School and eight Tudor Revival homes. The district includes Mission/Spanish Revival, Bungalow/craftsman, Colonial Revival, and other architecture.

=== Cityscape ===
Oxnard is a combination of neighborhoods and urban development focused on the downtown, coastline, and harbor areas. The city's main land uses are industrial, residential, commercial, and open space. One and two-story buildings characterize the city. The two tallest buildings in the county are in the northern part of the city at Topa Financial Plaza. The fourteen-floor high-rise was built in 1973, and the 21-floor high-rise was built in 1986. The city is surrounded by agricultural land and the Pacific Ocean, as well as the Santa Clara River. The city's primary development lies along Highway 101 and the other main roads.

The Henry T. Oxnard Historic District is a 70-acre (28 ha) historic district that is listed on the National Register of Historic Places in Oxnard. Covering F and G Streets between Palm and 5th Sts., in the city, the district includes 142 houses, 139 which are "contributing buildings" and includes homes built mostly between 1906 and 1925. It contains abundant American-Craftsman and Revival architecture. Eric Andrist, owner of the district's Henry Levy House since 2021, has created a new website with a database of all of the houses and their basic stats and histories. He found that the original research to create the historic district was full of errors and is setting out to find documentation to correct it all with evidence including old news articles.

Ormond Beach is a beach along the Oxnard coast. The beach, which stretches for two miles, adjoins the Ormond Wetlands, some farmland, and power plant remains. It covers the area in between Points Hueneme and Mugu and is a well-known birding area. The beach historically contained marshes, salt flats, sloughs, and lagoons, but surrounding agriculture and industry have drained, filled, and degraded the beach and wetlands. A dune-transition zone-marsh system is still along much of the beach.

== Demographics ==
Historical population
Census	Pop.	Note	%±
1910	2,555		—
1920	4,417		72.9%
1930	6,285		42.3%
1940	8,519		35.5%
1950	21,567		153.2%
1960	40,265		86.7%
1970	71,225		76.9%
1980	108,195		51.9%
1990	142,216		31.4%
2000	170,358		19.8%
2010	197,899		16.2%
2020	202,063		2.1%
2024 (est.)	200,616	▼	−0.7%
U.S. Decennial Census

Oxnard, California – Racial and ethnic composition Note: the US Census treats Hispanic/Latino as an ethnic category. This table excludes Latinos from the racial categories and assigns them to a separate category. Hispanics/Latinos may be of any race.
Race / Ethnicity (NH = Non-Hispanic)	Pop 2000	Pop 2010	Pop 2020	% 2000	% 2010	% 2020
White alone (NH)	35,049	29,410	26,415	20.57%	14.86%	13.07%
Black or African American alone (NH)	5,923	4,754	4,235	3.48%	2.40%	2.10%
Native American or Alaska Native alone (NH)	597	424	392	0.35%	0.21%	0.19%
Asian alone (NH)	12,257	14,084	14,987	7.19%	7.12%	7.42%
Pacific Islander alone (NH)	562	537	489	0.33%	0.27%	0.24%
Other race alone (NH)	182	230	772	0.11%	0.12%	0.38%
Mixed race or Multiracial (NH)	2,981	2,909	3,789	1.75%	1.47%	1.88%
Hispanic or Latino (any race)	112,807	145,551	150,984	66.22%	73.55%	74.72%
Total	170,358	197,889	202,063	100.00%	100.00%	100.00%

=== 2020 ===
The 2020 United States census reported that Oxnard had a population of 202,063. The population density was 7,617.0 inhabitants per square mile (2,940.9/km^{2}). The racial makeup of Oxnard was 24.8% White, 2.4% African American, 3.3% Native American, 7.7% Asian, 0.3% Pacific Islander, 39.6% from other races, and 22.0% from two or more races. Hispanic or Latino of any race were 74.7% of the population.

The census reported that 99.1% of the population lived in households, 0.7% lived in non-institutionalized group quarters, and 0.2% were institutionalized.

There were 53,839 households, out of which 45.1% included children under the age of 18, 52.4% were married-couple households, 7.9% were cohabiting couple households, 24.2% had a female householder with no partner present, and 15.5% had a male householder with no partner present. 14.9% of households were one person, and 6.8% were one person aged 65 or older. The average household size was 3.72. There were 42,774 families (79.4% of all households).

The age distribution was 26.1% under the age of 18, 10.6% aged 18 to 24, 28.5% aged 25 to 44, 22.8% aged 45 to 64, and 12.0% who were 65 years of age or older. The median age was 33.7 years. For every 100 females, there were 99.6 males.

There were 56,615 housing units at an average density of 2,134.2 units per square mile (824.0 units/km^{2}), of which 53,839 (95.1%) were occupied. Of these, 53.6% were owner-occupied, and 46.4% were occupied by renters.

In 2023, the US Census Bureau estimated that the median household income was $93,372, and the per capita income was $30,413. About 8.8% of families and 10.8% of the population were below the poverty line.

=== 2010 ===
The 2010 United States census reported that Oxnard had a population of 197,899. The population density was 7,358 inhabitants per square mile (2,841/km^{2}). The racial makeup of Oxnard included 95,346 (48.2%) White, 5,771 (2.9%) African American, 2,953 (1.5%) Native American, 14,550 (7.4%) Asian, 658 (0.3%) Pacific Islander, 69,527 (35.1%) from other races, and 9,094 (4.6%) from two or more races. In addition, 145,551 people (73.5%) were Hispanic or Latino of any race. Non-Hispanic Whites were 14.9% of the population in 2010, compared to 42.6% in 1980.

The Census reported that 196,465 people (99.3% of the population) lived in households, 932 (0.5%) lived in non-institutionalized group quarters, and 502 (0.3%) were institutionalized.

There were 49,797 households, out of which 25,794 (51.8%) had children under the age of 18 living in them, 28,319 (56.9%) were opposite-sex married couples living together, 7,634 (15.3%) had a female householder with no husband present, 4,043 (8.1%) had a male householder with no wife present. There were 3,316 (6.7%) unmarried opposite-sex partnerships and 395 (0.8%) same-sex married couples or partnerships. 7,090 households (14.2%) were individuals, and 2,665 (5.4%) had someone who was 65 or older living alone. The average household size was 3.95. There were 39,996 families (80.3% of all households); the average family size was 4.20.

The population was spread out, with 59,018 people (29.8%) under the age of 18, 23,913 people (12.1%) aged 18 to 24, 57,966 people (29.3%) aged 25 to 44, 40,584 people (20.5%) aged 45 to 64, and 16,418 people (8.3%) who were 65 years of age or older. The median age was 29.9 years. For every 100 females, there were 103.0 males. For every 100 females age 18 and over, there were 102.4 males.

There were 52,772 housing units at an average density of 1,962 units per square mile (758 units/km^{2}), of which 27,760 (55.7%) were owner-occupied, and 22,037 (44.3%) were occupied by renters. The homeowner vacancy rate was 1.8%; the rental vacancy rate was 3.7%. 107,482 people (54.3% of the population) lived in owner-occupied housing units, and 88,983 (45.0%) lived in rental housing units.

== Economy ==
The economy of Oxnard includes defense, international trade, agriculture, manufacturing, and tourism. Oxnard is a manufacturing center in the Greater Los Angeles Area. The Port of Hueneme is the only deep-harbor commercial port between Los Angeles and San Francisco and moves trade within the Pacific Rim economies. Companies utilizing the Port include Del Monte Foods, Chiquita, BMW, Land Rover, and Jaguar. Other industries include finance, transportation, the high tech industry, and energy, particularly petroleum. Two large active oil fields underlie the city and adjacent areas: the Oxnard Oil Field, east of the city along 5th Street, and the West Montalvo Oil Field along the coast to the west of town. Tenby Inc.'s Oxnard Refinery, on 5th Street east of Del Norte Avenue, processes oil from both fields.

According to the city's 2024/25 Budget, the top employers in the city are:

#	Employer	# of Employees
1	Oxnard School District	3,870
2	Reiter	2,447
3	City of Oxnard	1,960
4	CommonSpirit Health	1,933
5	Procter & Gamble	1,898
6	St. John's Regional Medical Center	1,500
7	Haas Automation	1,390
8	Oxnard Union High School District	1,203
9	Spatz Laboratories	1,117
10	Raypak	557

Some of the major companies headquartered in Oxnard are Haas Automation, Seminis, Raypak, Drum Workshop, Borla Performance, Boss Audio, Seed Beauty, and Robbins Auto Tops Procter & Gamble and Sysco maintain their West Coast operations in Oxnard.

In October 2020, city officials announced that once a large swath of agricultural land is fully developed into a business park by late 2021, it is estimated that up to 8,700 jobs will be created in the area. An Amazon fulfillment center opened in 2022 that serves Ventura, Santa Barbara, San Luis Obispo counties.

=== Agriculture ===
"The areas studied showed a high percentage of Group I soils, primarily located on the relatively flat Oxnard Plain. The Oxnard Plain, because of these high-quality agricultural soils, coupled with a favorable climate, is considered one of the most fertile areas in the world."

In 1995, SOAR (Save Open Space and Agricultural Resources) was initiated by farmers, ranchers, and citizens of Ventura County to keep land in the Oxnard Plain from development.

==== Strawberries ====
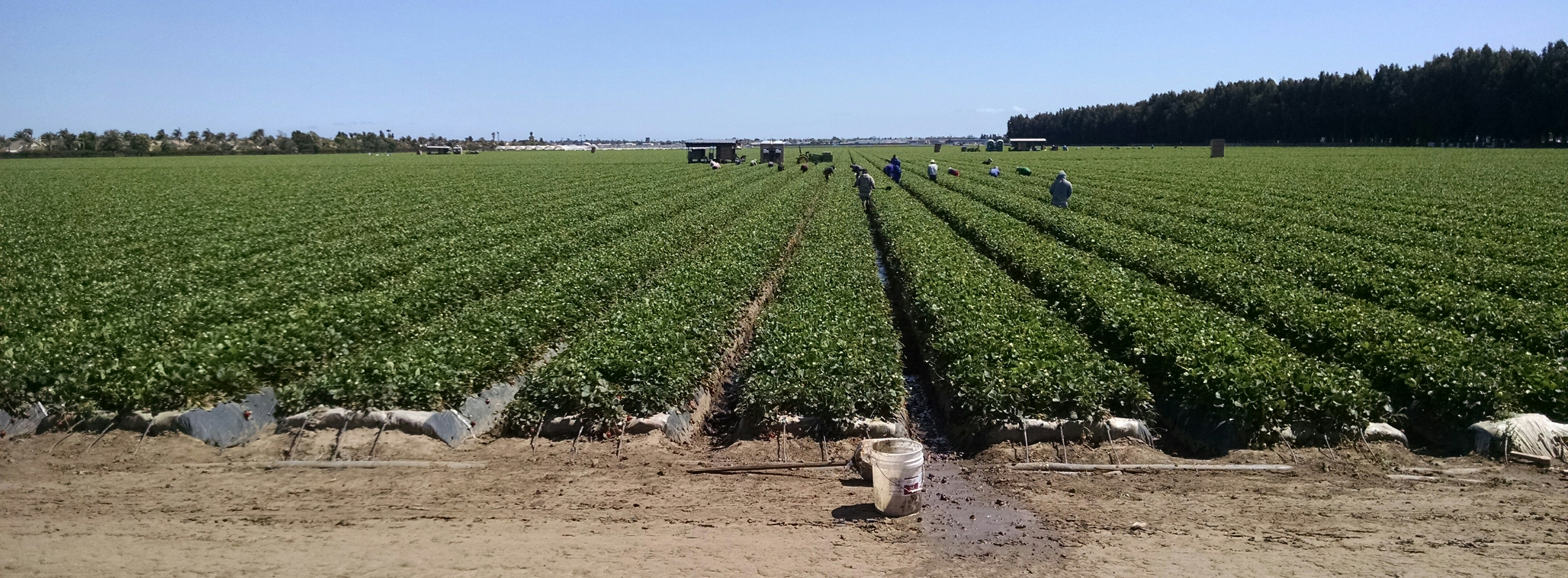
Strawberry field

The Oxnard Plain is well known for its strawberries. According to the USDA, Oxnard is California's largest strawberry producer, supplying about one-third of the State's annual strawberry volume. From the end of September through the end of October, strawberries are planted and harvesting occurs from mid-December through mid-July in Oxnard. The peak harvesting season in California runs from April through June when up to 10 million pint baskets of strawberries are shipped daily. The state of California supplies over 85 percent of U.S. strawberries, with the U.S. supplying a quarter of total world production of strawberries.

The annual California Strawberry Festival features vendors as well as food items based on the fruit such as strawberry nachos, strawberry pizza, strawberry funnel cake, strawberry sundaes, and strawberry champagne.

Pests that attack this crop are economically impactful in this town. Much of the research and effort is expended here and in Watsonville and Salinas. Economically significant insects include the Greenhouse Whitefly (Trialeurodes vaporariorum).

==== Cannabis ====
In 2018, 80% of the voters approved a cannabis tax. The city council adopted a "go slow" approach upon the legalization of recreational cannabis in California. Companies must be licensed by the local agency and the state to grow, test, or sell cannabis and the city may authorize none or only some of these activities. Local governments may not prohibit adults who comply with state laws from growing, using, or transporting marijuana for personal use. After an initial ban, businesses focusing on manufacturing, testing, and distributing cannabis were allowed to apply for a permit to operate in July 2019. An initial process in May 2020 to select retail proposals was challenged by unsuccessful applicants. After revising the city ordinance, the council decided in September 2020 to allow ten retail licences to be issued. A social equity component to maximize the ability for communities of color to benefit from the new industry as owners and investors and managers and employees as allowed by state law was not included. The city requires dispensaries to be a minimum of 600 feet (180 m) from schools or daycare centers. A special-use permit was approved for a retail store in an Oxnard Shores neighborhood shopping center in February 2022 amidst organized opposition from the neighborhood. The first dispensary in the city opened in the downtown area in December 2022.

=== Oil fields ===
==== Oxnard ====
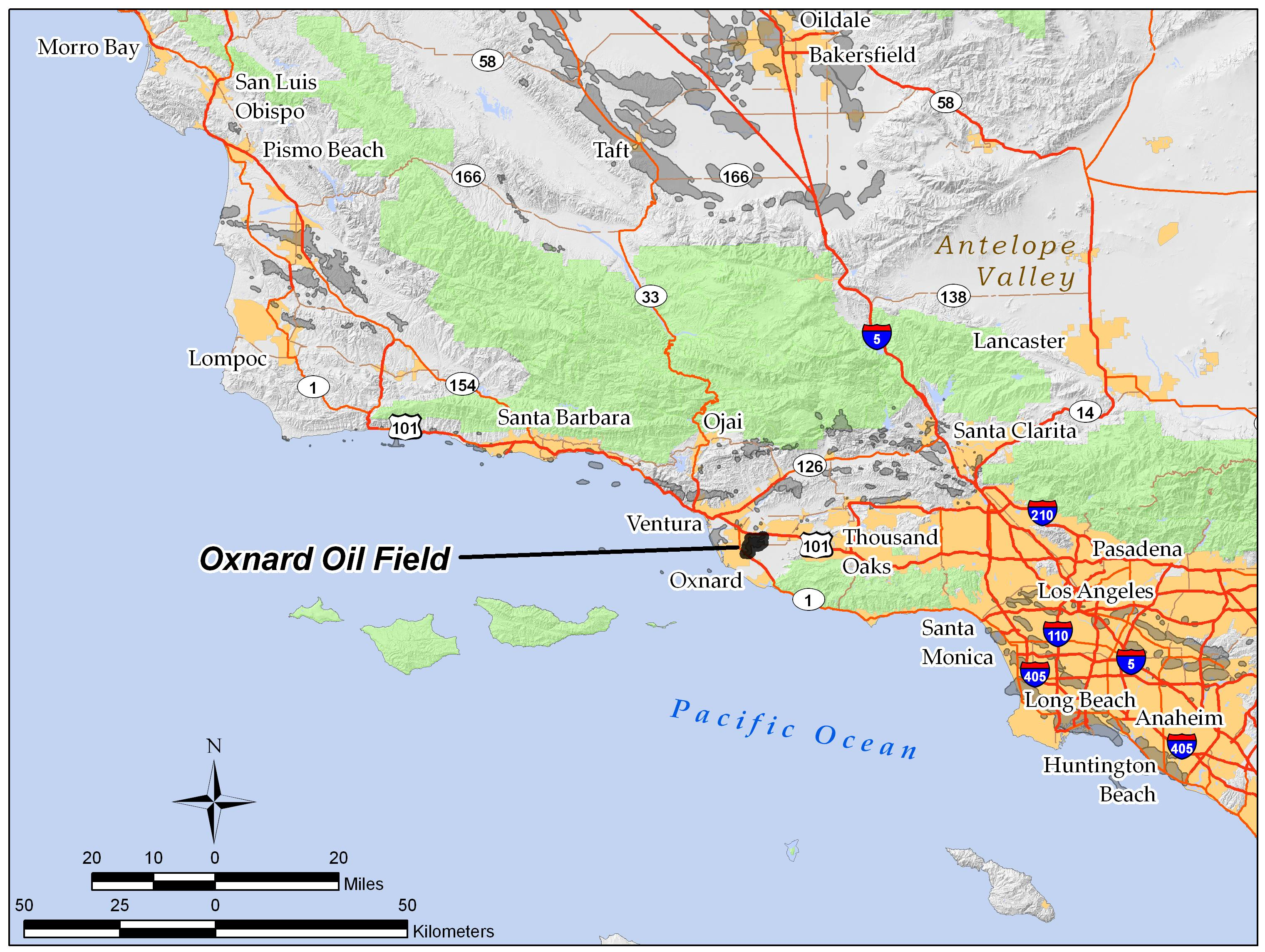
The Oxnard Oil Field in Ventura County, California. Other oil fields are shown in dark gray.

The Oxnard Oil Field is a large and productive oil field in and adjacent to the city of Oxnard, in Ventura County, California, in the United States. Its conventional oil reserves are close to exhaustion, with only an estimated one percent of the original oil recoverable with current technology remaining: 434,000 barrels (69,000 m^{3}) out of an original 43.5 million. However, the reservoir includes an enormous deposit of tar sands, ultra-heavy oil classed as an unconventional petroleum reserve, and potentially containing 600 million barrels (95,000,000 m^{3}) of oil equivalent, should it become economically feasible to extract. Present operators on the field include Tri-Valley Oil & Gas Co., Anterra Energy Services, Inc., Chase Production Co., and Occidental Petroleum through its Vintage Production subsidiary. As of the beginning of 2009, there were 34 active wells on the field.

==== West Montalvo ====
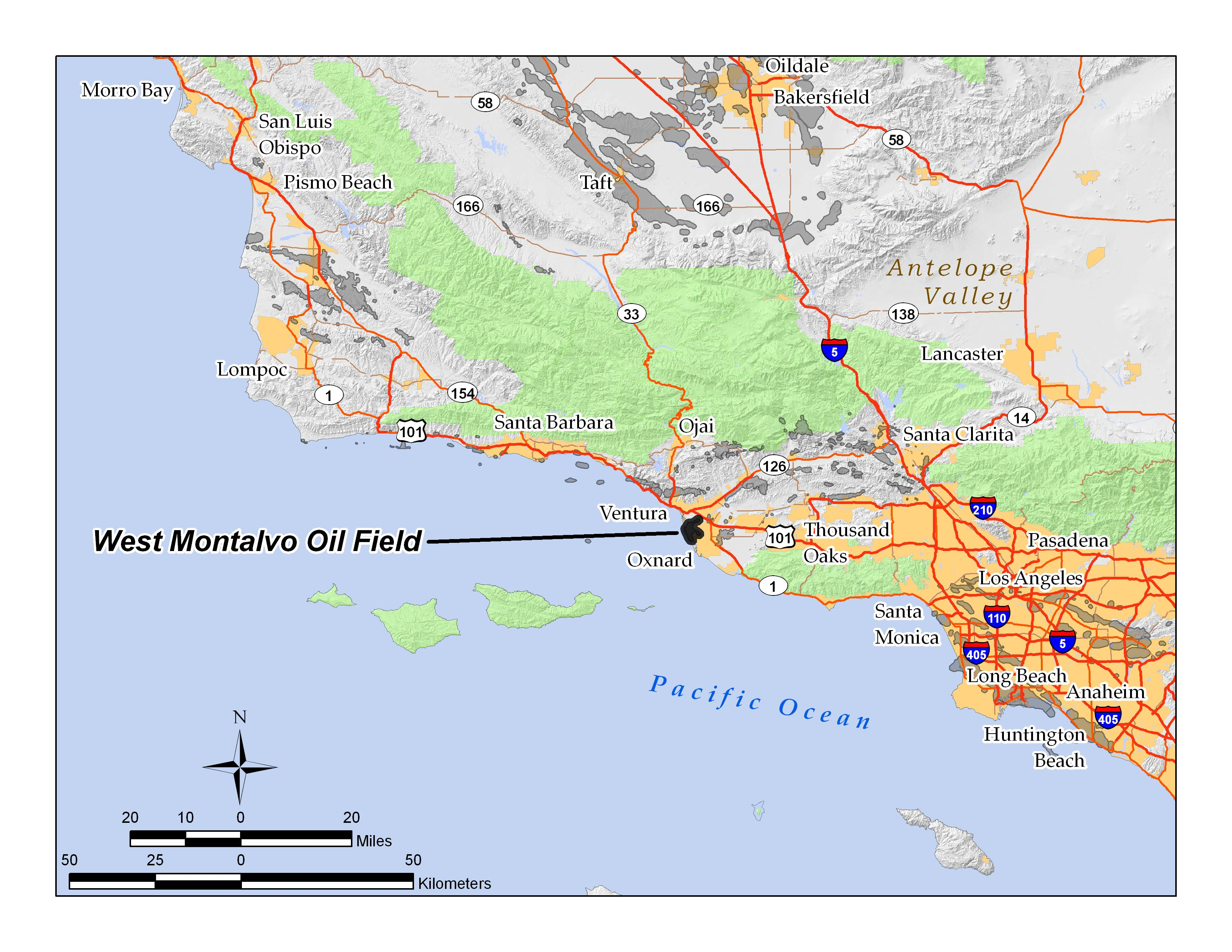
The West Montalvo Oil Field in Ventura County, California. Other oil fields are shown in dark gray.

The West Montalvo Oil Field is a large and productive oil field on the coast of Ventura County, California, in the United States, in and adjacent to the city of Oxnard, California. Discovered in 1947, it has produced approximately 50 million barrels (7,900,000 m^{3}) of oil, and originally contained up to 650 million barrels of oil in both the onshore and offshore areas. The offshore portion of the field is exploited from wells directionally drilled from onshore near McGrath Lake, from within an enclosure above the high-tide line at McGrath State Beach.

== Arts and culture ==
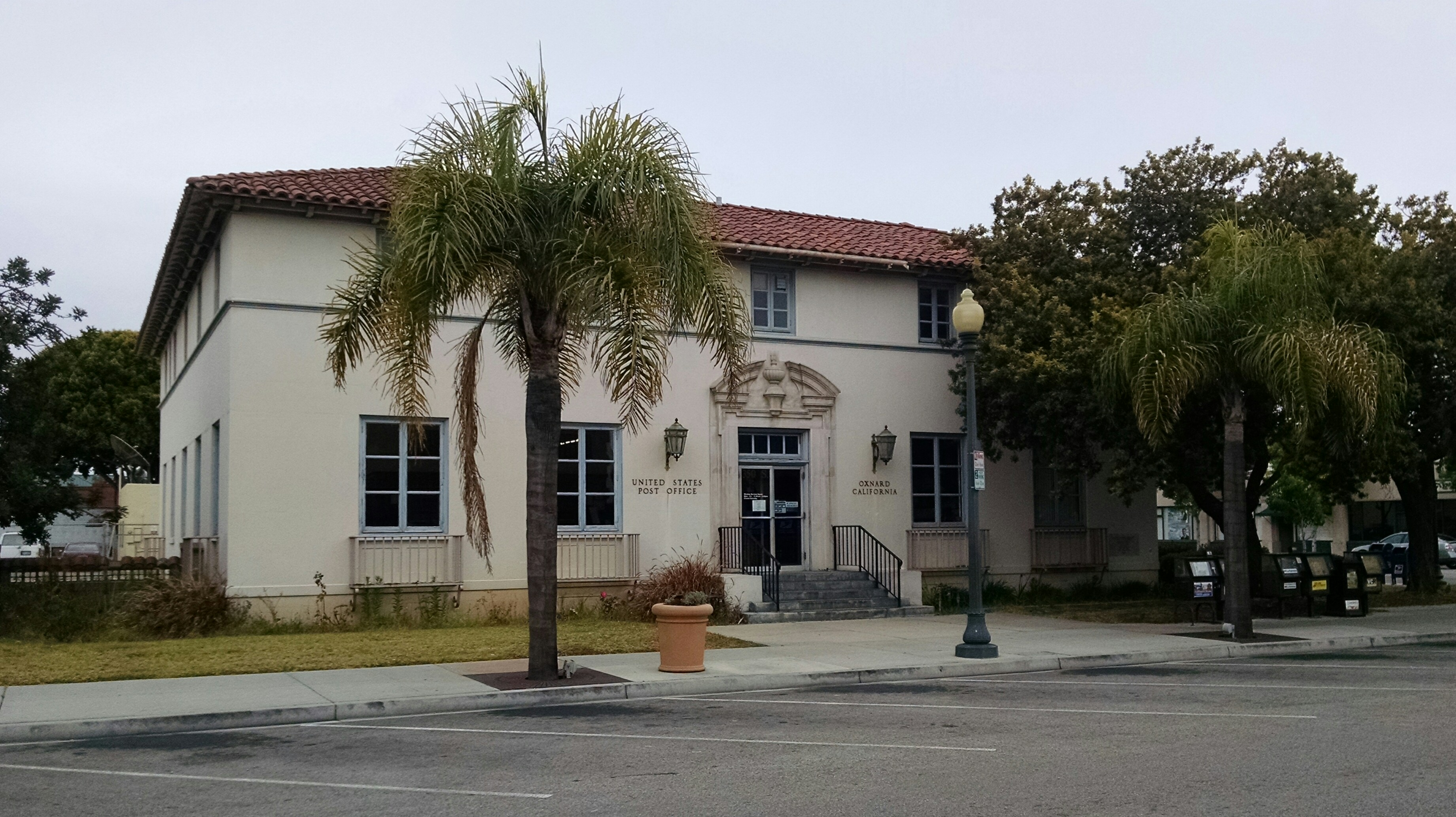
Oxnard Post Office

Oxnard cultural institutions include the Carnegie Art Museum, founded in 1907 as the Oxnard Public Library by philanthropist Andrew Carnegie; the Chandler Vintage Museum of Transportation and Wildlife, founded by the late Los Angeles Times publisher Otis Chandler, and the Channel Islands Maritime Museum. The Henry T. Oxnard Historic District is adjacent to the commercial downtown area and dates back to the founding of the city.

Heritage Square in downtown is a collection of restored Victorian and Craftsman houses that Oxnard's pioneer ranching families once owned. Heritage Square is home to the Petit Playhouse and the Elite Theatre Company. The Oxnard Performing Arts and Convention Center is home to the New West Symphony. The Gottfried Maulhardt/Albert Pfeiler Farm site is an historic farm park.

Oxnard also has the Oxnard Independent Film Festival and the annual Channel Islands Tall Ships Festival. The Herzog Winery is based in Oxnard along with other wine tasting rooms. During late July, the annual Salsa Festival is held in downtown Oxnard, featuring a salsa tasting tent, local bands, a large dance floor, local vendors, as well as many salsa based food vendors. The annual Reggae Jam on the Coast began to be hosted at College Park in 1994, drawing thousands of patrons.

== Sports ==
The Dallas Cowboys currently hold their pre-season training camp at River Ridge Field in Oxnard. They also trained in Oxnard in 2001, 2004–06, 2008–10 and 2012–16 (the Cowboys trained at California Lutheran University in nearby Thousand Oaks in 1963–89). The New Orleans Saints trained in Oxnard in 2011. The Los Angeles Raiders trained at River Ridge in the 1980s and 90s.

On February 4, 2016, the Los Angeles Rams selected Oxnard to be the site of their official team activities and minicamp. On February 19, 2016, the city of Oxnard and the Rams reached a tentative agreement to host official team activities and minicamps at River Ridge Playing Fields. On February 23, 2016, the Oxnard City Council voted unanimously 5–0 to allow the Los Angeles Rams to use the River Ridge Playing Fields facility from April 18 to June 17 and the locker room space from March 28 until June 24.

River Ridge Golf Course has two 18-hole courses flanked by housing developments.

== Government ==
Oxnard lies within the 26th congressional district, which is represented by Democrat Julia Brownley.

== Education ==
The city of Oxnard is served by 54 public school campuses, which educate more than 53,000 students in grades K–12.

=== Public elementary and junior high schools ===
The city of Oxnard and surrounding communities are served by four different school districts that oversee education for students grades K–8. They are:

- Hueneme School District: Serves 7,600 students at 11 campuses in South Oxnard, Port Hueneme and Oxnard beach neighborhoods.
- Oxnard School District: Serves 18,000 students at 21 campuses throughout Oxnard.
- Ocean View Elementary School District: Serves 3,000 students at six campuses in South Oxnard.
- Rio School District: Serves 5,000 students at eight North Oxnard and El Rio campuses.

On February 12, 2008, a shooting involving students occurred at E.O. Green Junior High School in Oxnard. Larry King was shot in one of the classrooms, from which he was taken to St. John's Hospital and later died.

The Roman Catholic Archdiocese of Los Angeles administers three private K–8 schools in Oxnard and one Roman Catholic High School.

=== Roman Catholic grade schools ===
- Our Lady of Guadalupe Elementary School, Oxnard (La Colonia) K-8
- Santa Clara Elementary School, Oxnard, TK-8
- Saint Anthony Elementary School, South Oxnard, K-8

=== High schools ===
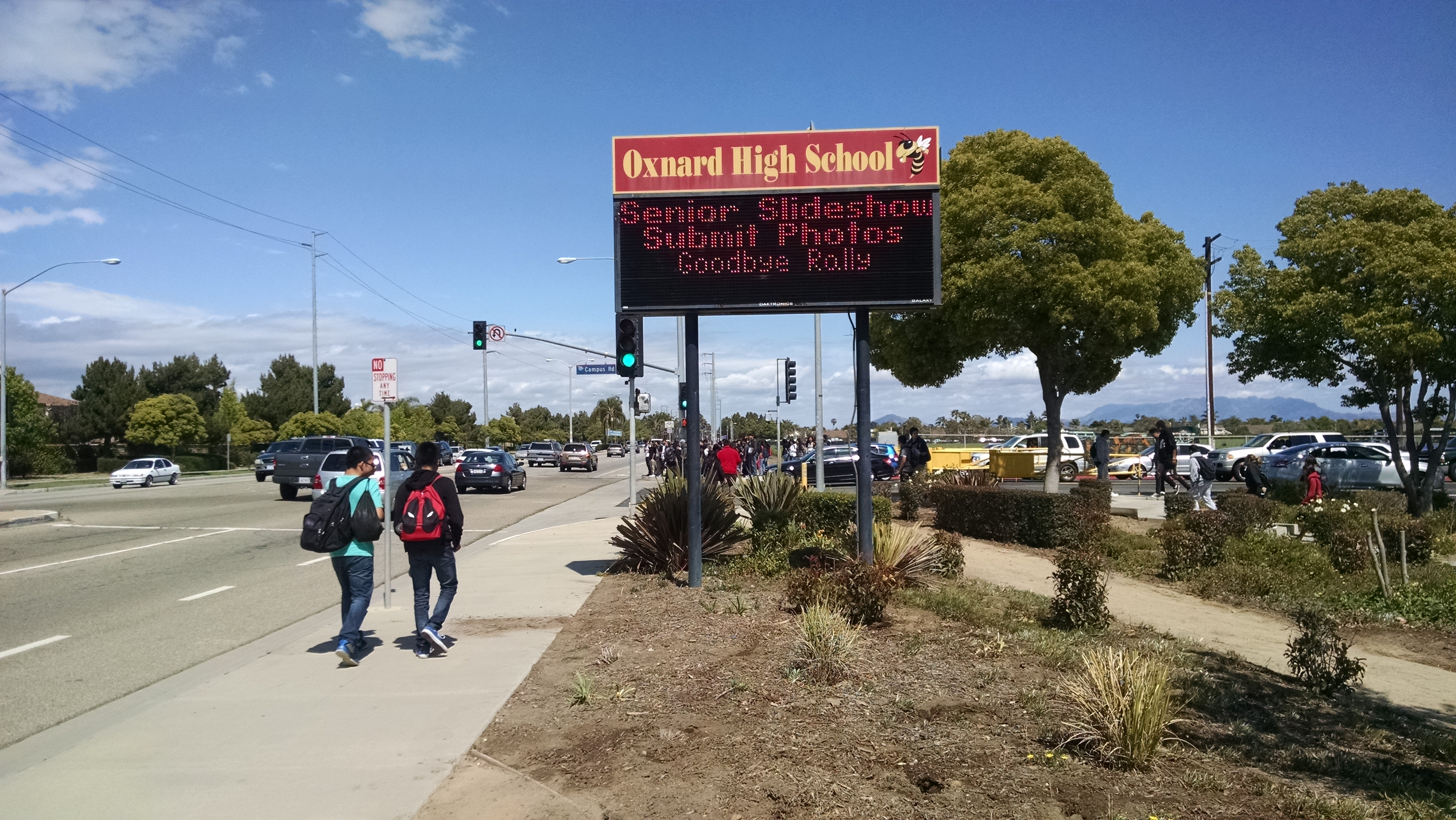
Oxnard High School

All public high schools in Oxnard are operated by the Oxnard Union High School District (OUHSD), which provides high school education to 20,000 students at ten campuses in three cities (Oxnard, Camarillo and Port Hueneme) as well as the unincorporated areas of El Rio, Somis, Silver Strand, and Hollywood Beach. OUHSD campuses in and around Oxnard include Channel Islands High School, Hueneme High School, Oxnard High School, Pacifica High School, Oxnard Middle College High School, Rio Mesa High School and Del Sol High School, as well as Oxnard Adult School.

Santa Clara High School is a private Roman Catholic high school administered by the Archdiocese of Los Angeles.

=== Colleges and universities ===
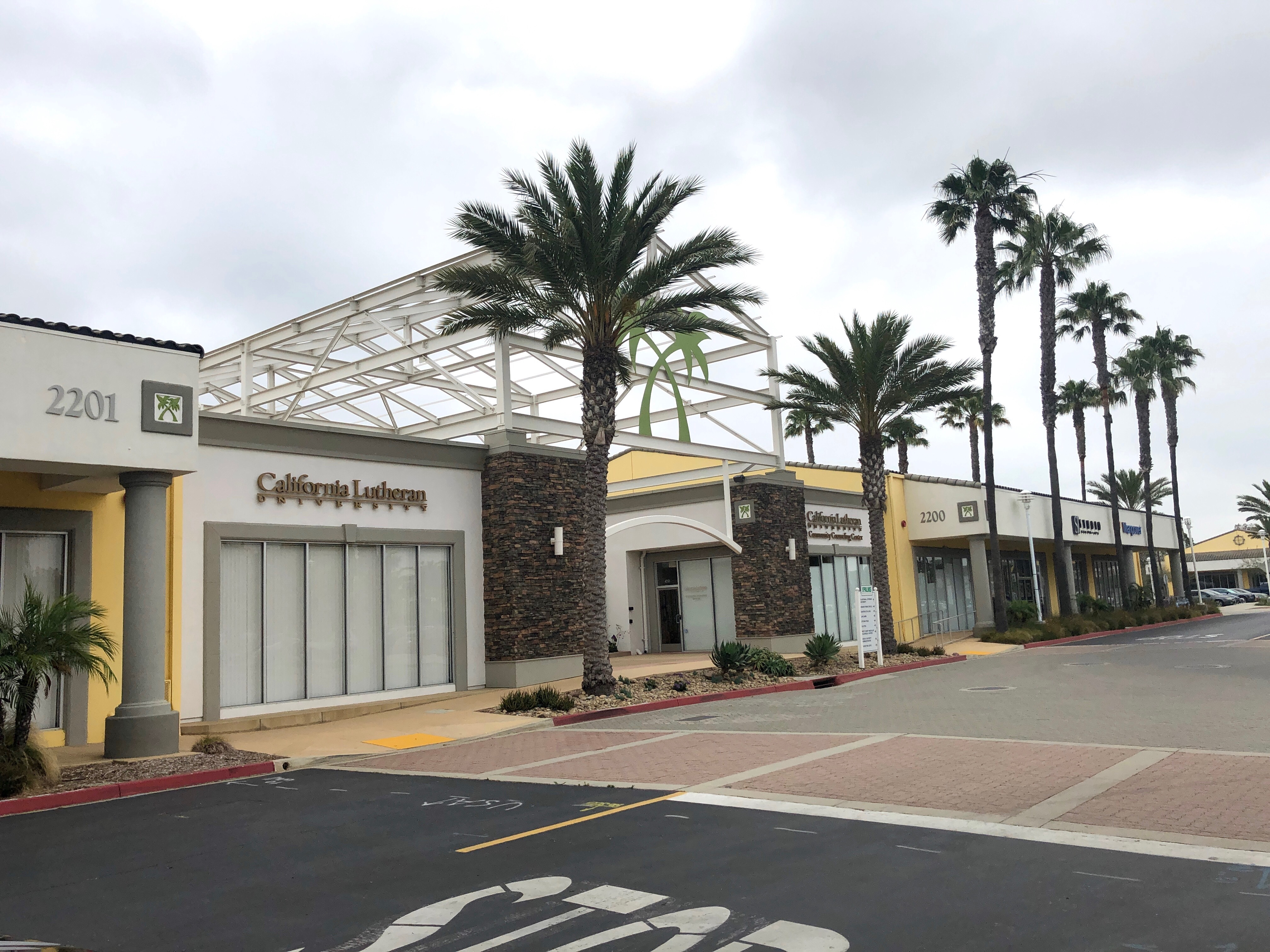
Cal Lutheran Oxnard Center

Oxnard is served on the collegiate level by Oxnard College and nearby California State University Channel Islands. Additionally, California Lutheran University, California State University, Northridge, University of Phoenix, University of California, Santa Barbara, National University, and Azusa Pacific University have satellite campuses in Oxnard.

== Library ==
The city operates a free public library system with three locations: the Downtown Main Library, the Colonia Branch Library, and the South Oxnard Branch Library. Some library sites include a Homework Center and an adjacent daycare center.

== Infrastructure ==
=== Sanitation ===
Oxnard collects and processes trash, recyclables, and green waste for its citizens and businesses. The city also has a large treatment plant for the collection of wastewater through the sanitary sewer. An anaerobic digester breaks down solids as waste moves through the plant.

== Transportation ==
=== Road ===
The Ventura Freeway (US 101) is the major highway running through Oxnard, connecting Ventura and Santa Barbara to the northwest, and Los Angeles to the southeast. The Pacific Coast Highway (State Route 1) heads down the coast south to Malibu. Highway 34 (Fifth Street) connects downtown Oxnard with Camarillo by running east parallel with the Southern Pacific Coast Line, which carries Coast Starlight, Pacific Surfliner and Ventura County Line passenger trains. State Route 232 (Vineyard Avenue) heads northeast, providing connections to California State Route 118 to Saticoy and the junction with California State Route 126 which goes to Santa Paula, Fillmore and Santa Clarita.

=== Port ===
The Port of Hueneme is located south of Oxnard in the city of Port Hueneme and is jointly operated by the United States Navy and the Oxnard Harbor District. The port is the only deep water port between the Port of Long Beach and the Port of San Francisco, as well as the only military deep water port between San Diego Bay and Puget Sound.

The Port of Hueneme is a shipping and receiving point for a wide variety of resources with destinations in the larger population centers of the Los Angeles Basin. Resources include automobiles, pineapple, and bananas. Agricultural products such as onions, strawberries, and flowers are shipped.

The United States Navy maintains a facility at Port Hueneme in support of the naval air station at Point Mugu to the south, with which it comprises Naval Base Ventura County. Port Hueneme is the West Coast home of the Naval Construction Force, the "Seabees", as well as a link in the coastal radar system.

=== Harbor ===
Channel Islands Harbor provides recreational boating and commercial fishing moorings. It shares the nickname "Gateway to the Channel Islands" with Ventura Harbor seven miles (11 km) to the north because operations that sail to the islands out of the harbors. Both harbors are vital fishing industry harbors.

=== Airport ===
Oxnard Airport is a general aviation airport within the city that is owned and operated by the County of Ventura. While commercial service was offered in the past, no airlines currently provide service.

=== Public transit ===
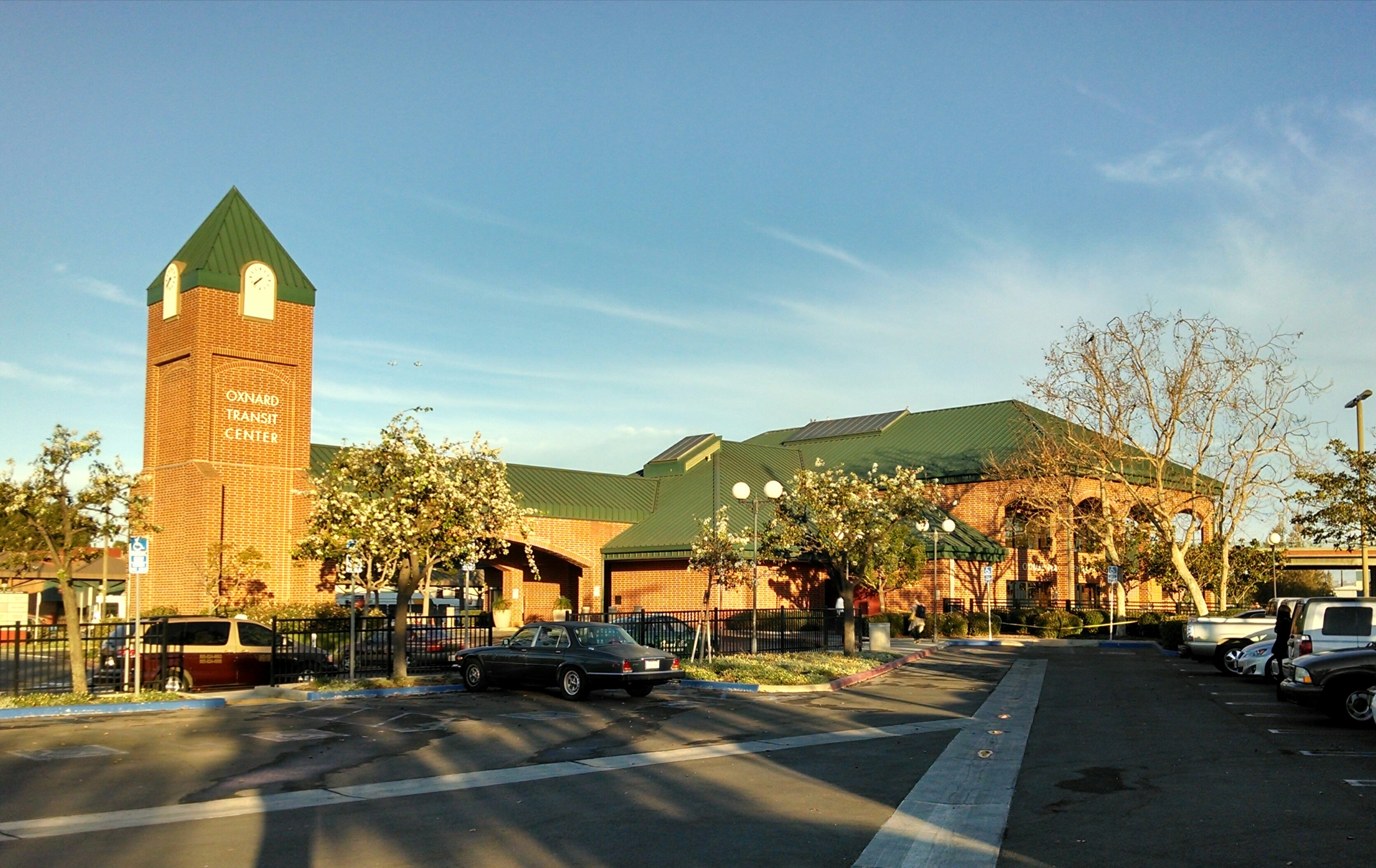
Oxnard Transit Center

The Oxnard Transit Center serves as a major transit hub for the city and the west county.

==== Rail ====
Metrolink
Six round-trip trains from the Ventura County Line provide commuter service to Los Angeles on weekdays during peak hours.

Amtrak
Ten round-trip Pacific Surfliners daily through Los Angeles to San Diego. Some northbound trains to Santa Barbara continue to San Luis Obispo. The Coast Starlight, which travels from Los Angeles to Seattle, stops twice a day (once in each direction), making the west Ventura County stop here (east county stop is Simi Valley).

==== Bus ====
Gold Coast Transit District
Operates local bus service in the city of Oxnard, Port Hueneme, Ventura, and Ojai. Its hub is the Oxnard Transit Center.

VCTC Intercity
Operates three Conejo Connection buses during peak hours towards the Warner Center Transit Hub in the San Fernando Valley, connecting with the Metro G Line. The Conejo Connection does not go to the Oxnard Transit Center, but instead stops at the Esplanade Shopping Center near Highway 101. VCTC also operates the Coastal Connection through Ventura towards Santa Barbara and Goleta from the Esplanade.

A smaller transfer center at the Centerpoint Mall on C Street for Gold Coast Transit serves South Oxnard and Port Hueneme routes. VCTC also operates the Oxnard-CSUCI route to California State University, Channel Islands and Oxnard College from this transfer center.

== In popular culture ==
Oxnard is mentioned in the season 3 episode of The Big Bang Theory entitled "The Jiminy Conjecture". Sheldon and Howard bet on what kind of cricket they hear in the hallway from Sheldon's apartment. They take the cricket to Professor Crawley (Lewis Black), a Caltech entomologist. While consulting Professor Crawley, he informs them that since he lost his funding, he has to move in with his daughter in Oxnard.

Oxnard is also the name of Anderson .Paak's third studio album.

The city of Oxnard is featured in the season 1 Nickelodeon sitcom Sam & Cat in Episode 22 titled, "#Lumpatious". The episode involves the titular characters attempting to get the word "lumpatious" added to the in-universe "Oxnard English Dictionary". However, the characters believe that the only way to get the word added to the dictionary is to meet with the people who run the dictionary called "the word keepers", who convene in the headquarters of the dictionary located in Oxnard, and convince them to add the word to the dictionary.

== Notable people ==
=== Political and cultural ===
- Lucy Hicks Anderson: trans woman, socialite, and chef, most notable for being tried in the Ventura County court for perjury for marrying a man while "masquerading" as a woman in 1945.
- Lupe Anguiano: former nun and civil rights activist known for her work on women's rights, the rights of the poor, and protecting the environment.
- John L. Canley: retired United States Marine and recipient of the U.S. military's highest decoration, the Medal of Honor.
- César Chávez: farm worker, political activist, and union leader lived in the Colonia area of Oxnard during his childhood. Several streets and schools in the Oxnard area and surrounding areas bear his name. A home on Wright Road in the El Rio neighborhood, northwest of Highway 101 and Rose Avenue, is where Chavez lived with his family in the late 1950s while advocating for local farm workers. Also, the office of the National Farm Workers Association – which later became United Farm Workers — was on Cooper Road, east of Garfield Avenue in the Colonia neighborhood. The Oxnard office opened in 1966, the year of a historic march from Delano to Sacramento.
- William P. Clark: politician, served under President Ronald Reagan as the Deputy Secretary of State from 1981 to 1982, United States National Security Advisor from 1982 to 1983, and the Secretary of the Interior from 1983 until 1985.
- Alicia Cuarón: Mexican-American educator, human rights activist, and Franciscan nun
- Jean Harris: credited with protecting Ormond Beach Wetlands and 'olołkoy State Beach
- Meagan Hockaday: killed by police
- Maria Gulovich Liu: Ventura County real estate agent, OSS agent in WWII
- Armando Xavier Ochoa: was the Bishop of Fresno and was formerly the Bishop of El Paso.
- Carmen Perez is an activist on issues of civil rights, including mass incarceration, women's rights and gender equity, violence prevention, racial healing, and community policing.
- Alfred V. Rascon: awarded the Medal of Honor—the United States' highest military decoration.
- James Sumner: After military service, he was awarded the Medal of Honor, the United States' highest military decoration. He resided in Oxnard.
- Nao Takasugi: California State Assembly and mayor of Oxnard.

=== Authors ===
- Gilbert, Jaime, and Mario Hernandez: creators of the black-and-white independent comic Love and Rockets.
- Joyce La Mers, author of light poetry.
- Michele Serros, American author, poet, comedic social commentator, and writer for the George Lopez TV series.

=== Musicians and singers ===
- DJ Babu: Filipino American disc jockey for the Beat Junkies and Dilated Peoples
- Ritchie Blackmore: guitarist with Deep Purple and founder of Ritchie Blackmore's Rainbow
- Sonny Bono & Cher: record producers, singers, actors; famous for Sonny & Cher pop duo and TV series, had a beach home in Oxnard Shores, Oxnard
- Cola Boyy: (Matthew Urango) musician and activist
- Brooke Candy: rapper
- Freddy Cannon: rock and roll singer
- Dave Carter: American folk singer-songwriter
- Down AKA Kilo: rapper
- Dave Grohl: musician
- Ill Repute: hardcore punk band and leaders of the Nardcore movement
- Kankick: American hip-hop producer
- Homer Keller: composer (1915–1996)
- Madlib: record producer, musician, rapper, and DJ noted for his work and collaborations in the jazz and hip-hop scenes
- Rich Moore: Academy Award-winning animation director (The Simpsons), and co-owner of Rough Draft Studios, Inc.
- Nails: powerviolence band
- Oh No: hip-hop rapper, producer and brother of Madlib
- Anderson .Paak: rapper, singer, songwriter, and drummer famous for reviving West Coast soul and R&B
- Dudley Perkins: rapper, singer, songwriter, producer
- Ryan Seaman: drummer
- Shirley Verrett: operatic mezzo-soprano, 1931–2010
- The Warriors: hardcore band
- Steve Zaragoza: internet personality, comedian, and host on SourceFed

=== Scholars and scientists ===
- William Bright: Linguist who specialized in Native American and South Asian languages
- J. Richard Chase: President of Biola University and Wheaton College
- Robert P. Sharp: An American geomorphologist and expert on the geological surfaces of the Earth and the planet Mars, born and raised in Oxnard.

=== Businesspeople ===
- Martin V. ("Bud") Smith: developer and philanthropist, the most significant developer in the Oxnard area, built the Financial Plaza Towers and financed the construction of CSUCI's school of business and economics. His first real estate project was the Wagon Wheel Motel & Restaurant and Wagon Wheel Junction.
- Charles C. Lynch is the former owner of a city-sanctioned, awarded in 2006, a medical marijuana dispensary in Morro Bay, California. Lynch obtained a Medical marijuana dispensary Business License and a Medical Marijuana Nursery Permit and was a member of the local Chamber of Commerce. He was born in Oxnard.
- Stanley Clark Meston: An American architect, he is most famous for designing the original golden arches of McDonald's restaurants. He was born in Oxnard.
- Ben Rich: was director of Lockheed Skunk Works from 1975 to 1991 and retired to Oxnard.

=== Media professionals ===
- Autumn Durald Arkapaw – American cinematographer (born 1979)
- Walter Brennan, actor, three-time winner of Academy Award, star of TV series The Real McCoys and The Guns of Will Sonnett, died in Oxnard
- Miles Brown, an actor who is best known for his role as Jack Johnson on the sitcom Black-ish
- John Carradine, actor, lived in Oxnard for many years
- Lee Van Cleef, actor, died in Oxnard
- Jeffrey Combs, actor, born in Oxnard
- Brandon Cruz, child actor and lead singer of the punk band Dr. Know, has family and a beach home in Oxnard
- Brad Garrett, actor born in Oxnard
- Isiah Mustafa, the "Old Spice Guy," former NFL player
- Jamal Mixon, actor
- Bob Stephenson, actor, film producer and screenwriter
- Tricia Takasugi, reporter for KTTV Fox 11 News in Los Angeles
- Dan Tullis Jr., an actor most notable for his role on the sitcom Married... with Children

=== Athletes and sportspeople ===
- Bobby Ayala: former Major League Baseball pitcher; graduated from Rio Mesa High School
- Mark Berry: coach for the Cincinnati Reds; graduated from Hueneme High School
- The Bryan brothers: professional ATP tennis doubles players who have graduated from Rio Mesa High School
- Lorenzo Booker: NFL running back
- Graciela Casillas: boxer and kickboxer
- Hugo Centeno Jr.: boxer in the Middleweight division
- Keary Colbert: wide receiver for the Seattle Seahawks, all-time reception leader for USC Trojans, graduated from Hueneme High School
- Jacob Cruz: outfielder for the Cincinnati Reds, graduated from Channel Islands High School
- Tim Curran: professional surfer, graduated from Oxnard High School and resides in Oxnard
- Lou Cvijanovich: winningest coach in California high school history, coached Santa Clara High School to 829 wins from 1958 to 1999
- Maxim Dadashev trained in Oxnard with former world champion Buddy McGirt
- Justin De Fratus: relief pitcher for the Philadelphia Phillies, grew up in Oxnard, attended Rio Mesa High and Ventura Junior College
- Charles Dillon: wide receiver for Green Bay Packers, played for Ventura College and Washington State, graduated from Hueneme High School in 2004
- Terrance Dotsy: football player
- Justin Dumais: diver of the 2004 Summer Olympics
- Beverly Dustrude: second base-woman who played in the All-American Girls Professional Baseball League
- Tony Ferguson: a professional mixed martial artist in the lightweight division of the Ultimate Fighting Championship (UFC), born in Oxnard
- Scott Fujita: NFL linebacker for the Cleveland Browns, graduated from Rio Mesa High School and University of California, Berkeley
- Mikey Garcia: boxer
- Robert Garcia: retired professional boxer, former IBF Super Featherweight Champion
- Phil Giebler: race car driver, won Indianapolis 500 Rookie of the Year award for 2007
- Herculez Gomez: soccer player
- Jim Hall: race car driver, two-time winning car owner of the Indianapolis 500
- Lemuel Clarence "Bud" Houser: track athlete who won multiple Olympic gold medals, track athlete at Oxnard High School
- Jeremy Jackson: pro-UFC fighter, winner of King of the Mountain 2004, contestant in Ultimate Fighter 4 : The Comeback
- Ronney Jenkins: 2001 NFL Pro Bowl kick returner for the San Diego Chargers, graduated from Hueneme High School
- Nicole Johnson: Monster Jam monster truck driver, graduated from Rio Mesa High School
- Marion Jones: athlete, multiple Olympic gold medalist, attended and ran for Rio Mesa High School
- Eric King: former Major League Baseball pitcher, born in Oxnard
- Tim Laker: former Major League Baseball catcher, played college baseball at Oxnard Community College
- Dave Laut: UCLA graduate won Olympic Bronze at the 1984 Summer Olympics for shot put
- Whitney Lewis: former USC Trojans and University of Northern Iowa wide receiver, won 2003 Glenn Davis Award for the top player in Southern California
- Tony Malinosky: former Major League Baseball shortstop for the Brooklyn Dodgers, a longtime resident of Oxnard
- Kristal Marshall: professional wrestler formerly with the World Wrestling Entertainment
- Sergio Martínez: boxer based in Oxnard
- Paul McAnulty: Major League Baseball outfielder with the San Diego Padres
- Ken McMullen: former Major League Baseball third baseman with the Los Angeles Dodgers, born in Oxnard
- Kiara Nowlin: former member of the U.S. Junior National Trampoline and Tumbling Team, 3-time gold medalist at The Cheerleading Worlds, and acrobatic gymnast for Baylor University
- Victor Ortíz: professional boxer
- Mike Parrott: professional baseball player and coach, born in Oxnard
- Corey Pavin: professional golfer; winner of many tournaments, including 1995 U.S. Open; graduated from Oxnard High School
- Terry Pendleton: retired baseball player, 1991 National League MVP, graduated from Channel Islands High School
- Josh Pinkard: free safety for two-time national champion University of Southern California football team, graduated from Hueneme High School
- Brandon Rios: Former professional boxer, Former WBA World lightweight champion
- Jacob Rogers: offensive tackle for the Denver Broncos, three-year starter and All-American at USC, graduated from Oxnard High School
- Blaine Saipaia: football player for the St. Louis Rams, graduated from Channel Islands High School
- Aaron Small: former Major League Baseball pitcher
- Paul Stankowski: professional golfer, graduated from Hueneme High School
- Kevin Thomas: former NFL cornerback for the Buffalo Bills, graduated from Rio Mesa High School
- Josh Towers: pitcher for the Toronto Blue Jays, graduated from Hueneme High School and Oxnard College
- Steve Trachsel: pitcher for the Baltimore Orioles and New York Mets, born in Oxnard and attended Hathaway Elementary
- Fernando Vargas: retired boxer, two-time light-middleweight boxing champion, graduated from Channel Islands High School
- Dmitri Young: baseball player for the Washington Nationals, graduated from Rio Mesa High School
- Blake Wingle: offensive guard for the Pittsburgh Steelers, Green Bay Packers and the Cleveland Browns, graduated from Rio Mesa High School
- Cierre Wood: running back of the Canadian Football League (CFL); former member of the Houston Texans, the New England Patriots, and the Buffalo Bills; graduated from Santa Clara High School
- David Ochoa: soccer player in the MLS for Real Salt Lake and the Mexico Men's National Team, born in Oxnard
- Jeremiah Valoaga: NFL defensive end, graduated from Channel Islands High School
- Darius Vines: MLB pitcher born in Oxnard

== Sister city ==
Digital reproduction of the Oxnard-Ocotlan sister city flag presented at the Sister Cities bicentennial flag presentation around 1976.

Oxnard is sister cities with Ocotlán, Jalisco (Mexico). This relationship was commemorated with a flag at the Sister Cities bicentennial flag presentation sometime around 1976.

== See also ==
- Largest cities in Southern California
- Oxnard Air Force Base
- Oxnard, California−related topics
- Angelita C. et al. v. California Department of Pesticide Regulation
