= Oakley (Upperville, Virginia) =

Historic house in Virginia, United States

- U.S. National Register of Historic Places
- Virginia Landmarks Register
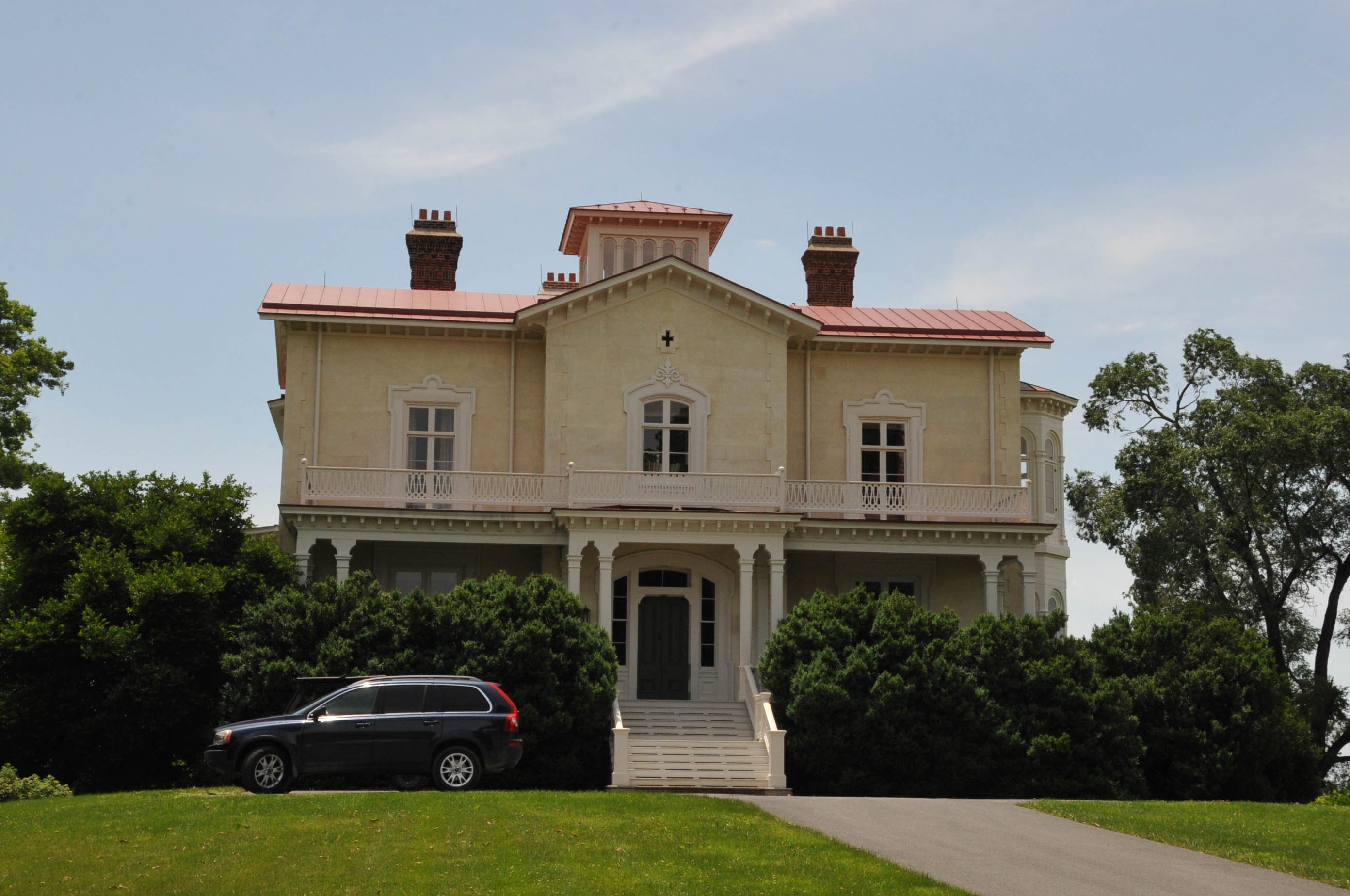

- Location within Northern Virginia Location within Virginia Location within the United States
- Location: East of Upperville on US 50, near Upperville, Virginia
- Coordinates: 38°58′40″N 77°51′52″W
- Area: 221 acres (89 ha)
- Built: 1853-1857
- Architectural style: Italianate
- NRHP reference No.: 83003282
- VLR No.: 030-0046

Significant dates
- Added to NRHP: February 24, 1983
- Designated VLR: June 15, 1982

Oakley is a historic home and farm located near Upperville, Fauquier County, Virginia.

== History ==
It was built between 1853 and 1857, and is a 2 1/2-story, three-bay, T-shaped brick Italianate style dwelling with a cross-gable roof. The house sits on an English basement and features tall decorative paneled chimneys, semi-hexagonal bays in each gable end, a central two-story pavilion, and a glazed cupola. Also on the property are the contributing original smokehouse and an early building, possibly a tenant house.

The house was built by Colonel Richard Henry Dulany and the property is located near the site of the Upperville Colt & Horse Show first held in June 1852. It remains the oldest such event in America.

It was listed on the National Register of Historic Places in 1983.
