= Trinity Episcopal Church (Upperville, Virginia) =

Church in Loudoun County, Virginia

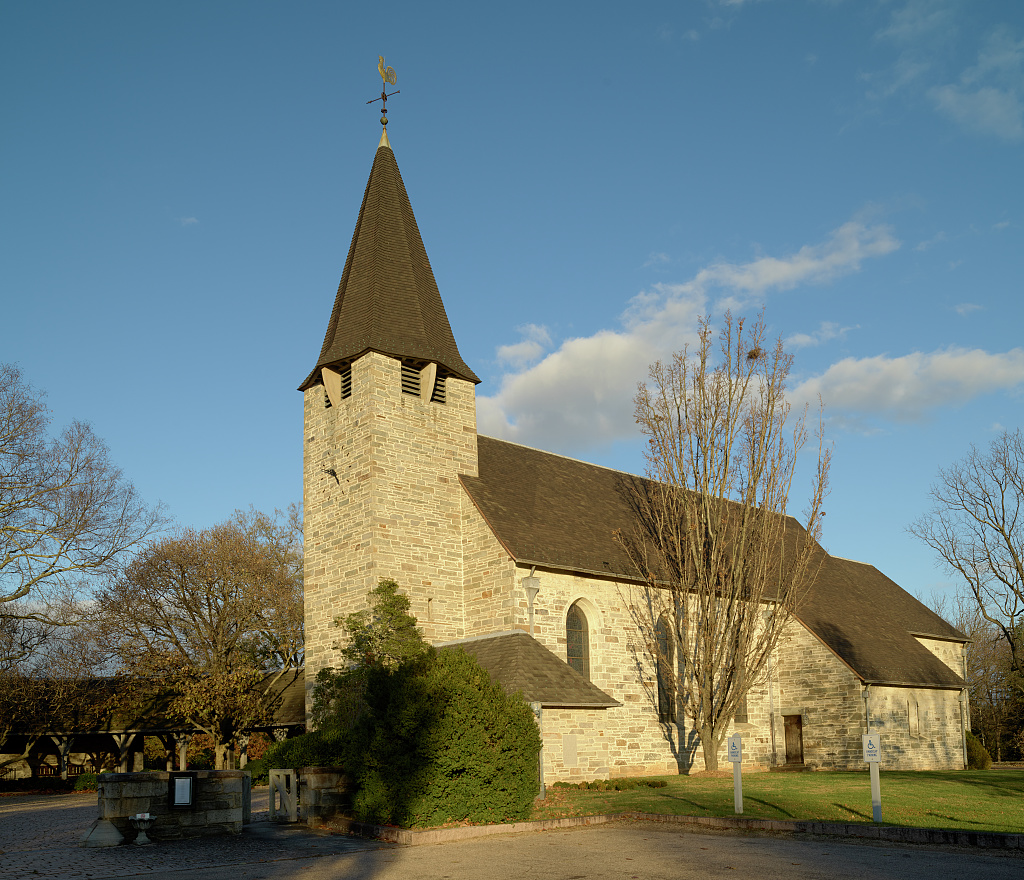
- Trinity Episcopal Church in 2019
- Trinity Episcopal Church
- 38°59′38.1″N 77°52′52.4″W
- Location: 9108 John S. Mosby Highway (VA Rte. 50), Upperville, Virginia, 20184
- Website: trinityupperville.org

History
- Founded: 1840, Meade Parish established 1842, first church building 1895, second church building 1960, current church building

Architecture
- Architect(s): H. Page Cross, architect W. J. Hanback, stone contractor Joep Nicolas, stained glass Heinz Warneke, church furniture P. A. Fiebiger, Inc., ironwork Joseph Whiteford, of Aeolian-Skinner, pipe organ
- Style: Neo-Norman
- Years built: 1951-60

Clergy
- Rector: The Rev. Jonathan V. Adams
- Trinity Episcopal Church
- U.S. Historic district – Contributing property
- Part of: Upperville Historic District (ID72001394)
- Added to NRHP: October 8, 2021

Trinity Episcopal Church is a historic Episcopal congregation in Upperville, Meade Parish, Fauquier County, Virginia. The principal buildings—church, parish hall, rectory—were built between 1951 and 1960. They are grouped around three sides of an octagonal courtyard, and form the centerpiece of a 35-acre campus. The Neo-Norman-style church and rectory are designated primary resources in the Upperville Historic District. Several of the church's other buildings are listed as contributing properties in the historic district.

The current church with its many embellishments was the gift of Upperville residents Paul and Rachel Lambert "Bunny" Mellon. They donated it to Meade Parish in memory of Mary Conover Mellon (1904-1946), Paul Mellon's first wife and the mother of their two children, who died suddenly at age 42. The new church was dedicated on September 28, 1960.

== History ==
The current church was the third built on the site. The first church building (1842) was demolished in February 1895, "and a new building was erected on the old foundation." By the 1940s, the second church building had extensive termite damage: "In 1948, it was apparent that the existing Episcopal Church building, built in 1895, was in poor condition, and the congregation was in dire need of a new building." Stained glass windows from the second church were removed, and later installed in the transepts of the current church.

=== Current church ===
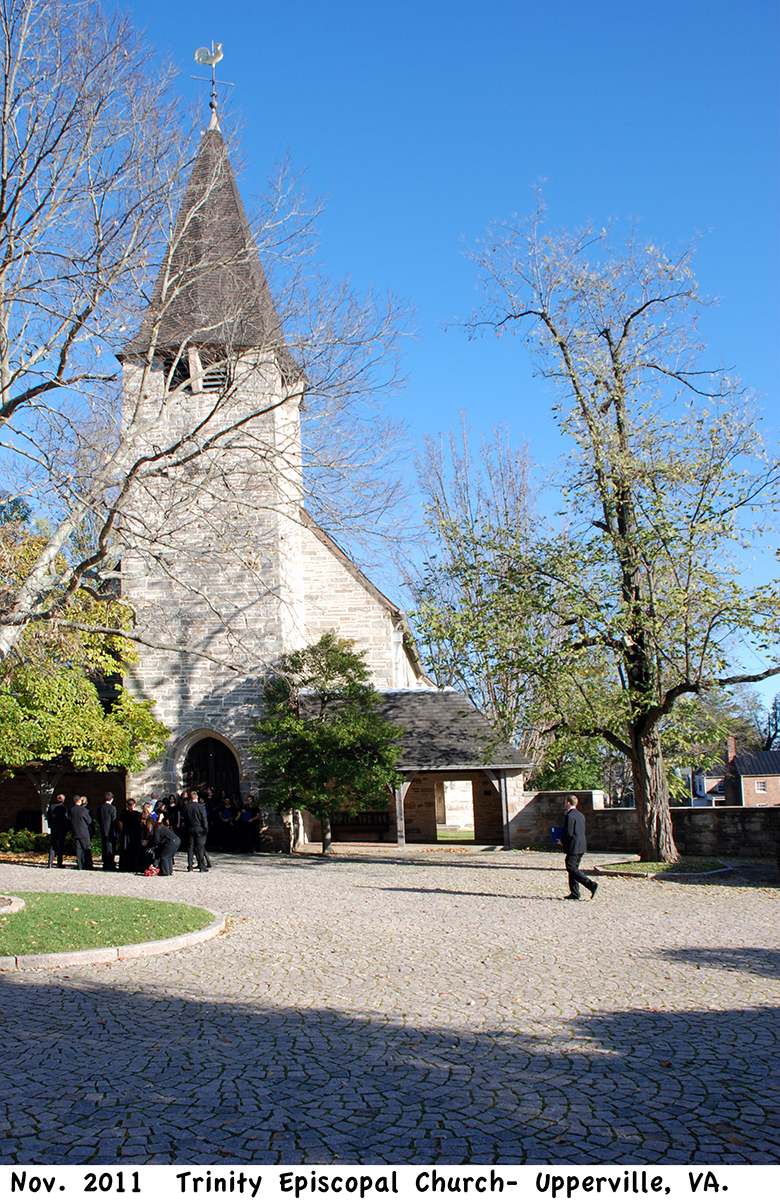
Church tower and courtyard

The third (and current) church was designed by neo-classicist architect H. Page Cross. Planning began in 1951, and construction was completed in 1960. The building's exterior and interior are Cross's free adaptations of French medieval churches of the twelfth and thirteenth centuries.

W. J. Hanback was the stone contractor, and managed a team of local masons. Joep Nicolas, of the Netherlands, created the church's stained glass windows. German-born American sculptor Heinz Warneke carved the church furniture and modeled the limestone capitals of the columns. P. A. Fiebiger, Inc., of New York City, created the nave's iron chandeliers, and the decorative ironwork throughout. Joseph Whiteford, of Aeolian-Skinner in Boston, built the pipe organ.

"Local craftsmen have been largely responsible for the beauty of the new Trinity Church in Upperville, Va. The Gothic church is made of Virginia sandstone. Each stone, not only of the exterior, but the interior as well, was hand cut by local masons. The children’s corner contains a white marble font used by the old Trinity Church for many years. The six bells of the Westminster chimes were cast in England and they bear the inscription, 'These bells are dedicated to the men of the countryside who by the skill of their hands have built this church. 1955-1960'."

=== NRHP ===
The National Register of Historic Places approved the boundaries of Upperville Historic District in 1972. “The original nomination lacked a comprehensive inventory of properties within the district,” and limited their period of historical significance to (1780-1899). In her 2021 update of the nomination, architectural historian Julie V. Langan proposed that Upperville Historic District's period of historical significance be expanded to (1780-1960). She also proposed the inclusion of local African-American churches and segregated schools that had not been listed in the 1972 NRHP nomination.
Langan's description of the church property from her 2021 NRHP nomination:

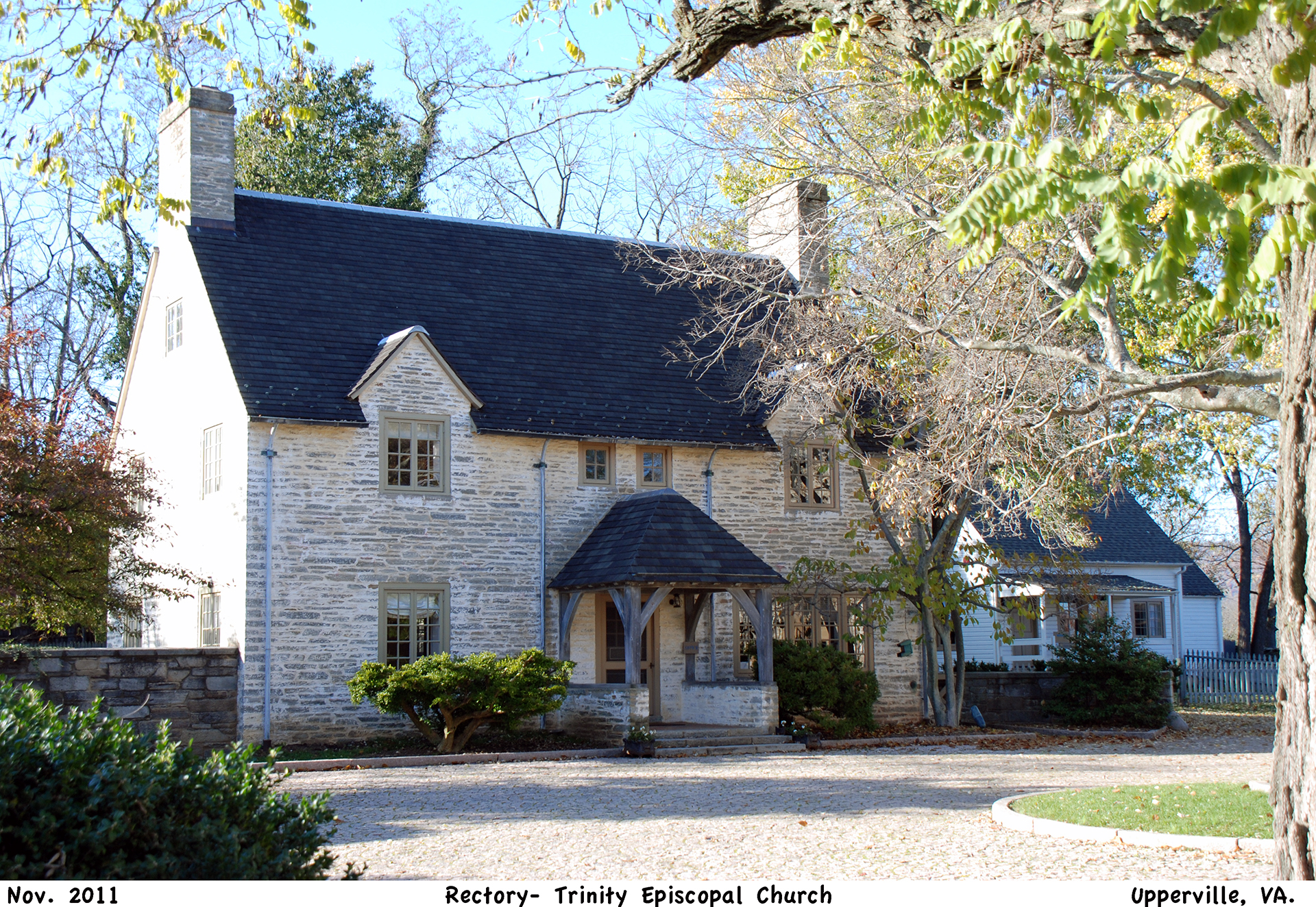
Pearn House (c.1951), built as the Rectory, it now houses the church offices.

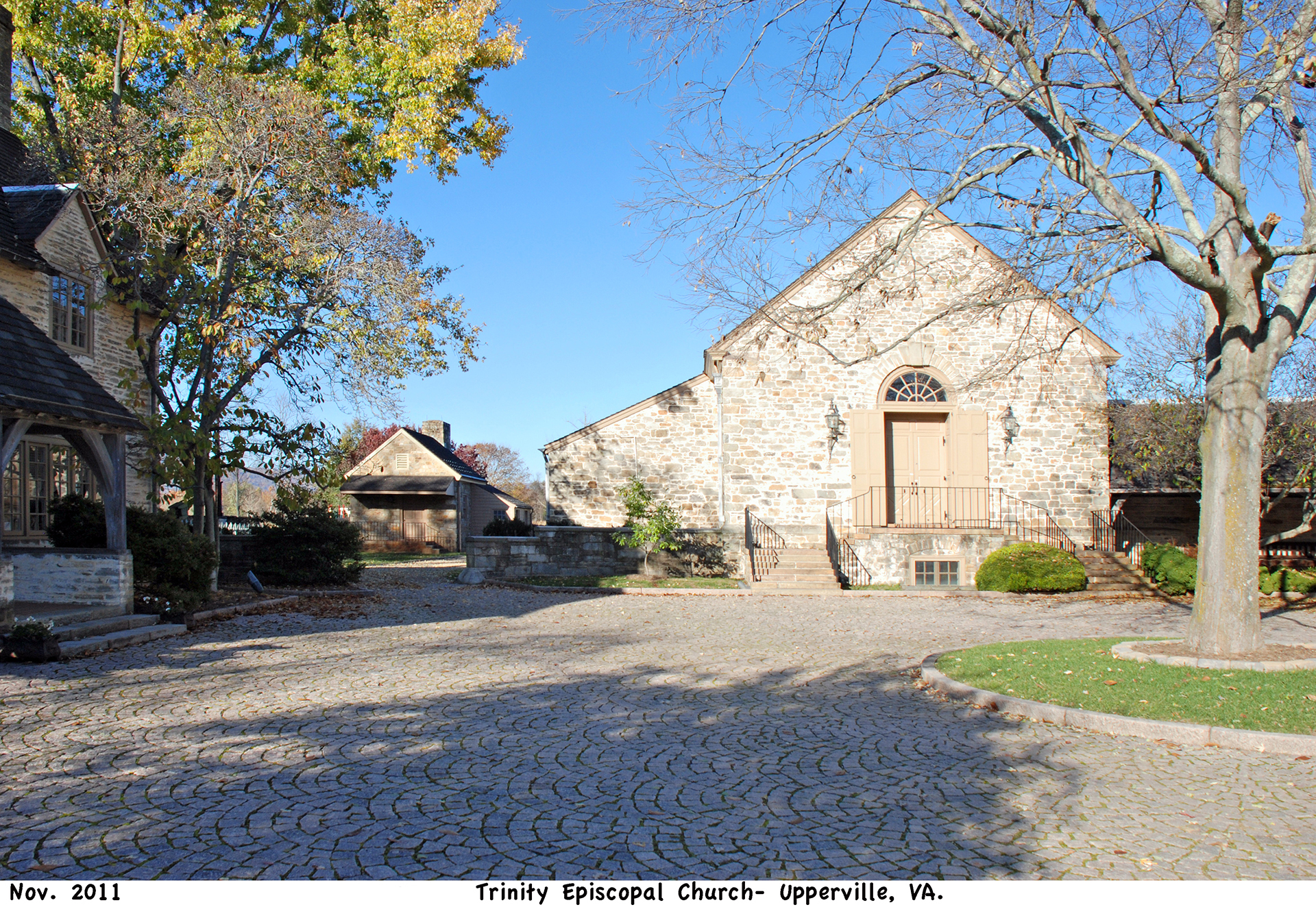
Cox Hall (parish hall), right, and Pearn House Garage, in background, left

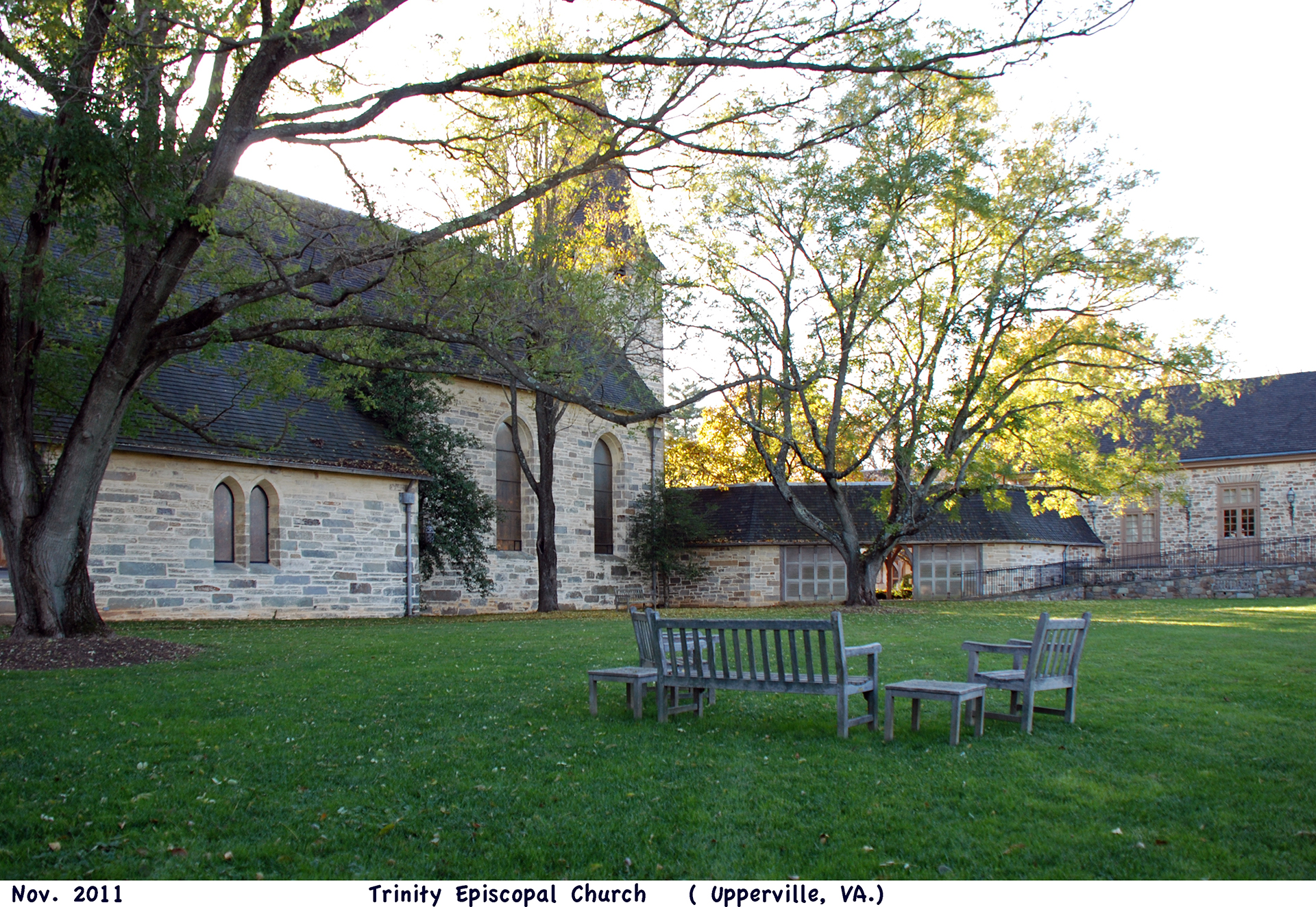
The Cloister (center) connects the Church and Cox Hall (parish hall).

On a large parcel at 9108-9110 John S. Mosby Highway is the Trinity Episcopal Church (030-5438-00410) and its supporting buildings, including a school and a fellowship hall, which are arranged around a cobblestone courtyard located behind a mortared rubble stone wall that runs along the north side of the highway. Construction of the two-story, stone church began in 1951 following the design of architect H. Page Cross of New York. It is an adaptation of French ecclesiastical architecture of the twelfth and thirteenth centuries using sandstone from a local quarry near Manassas. Warrenton builder W. J. Hanback implemented Cross’s plans. Built of roughly-coursed native sandstone, it is composed of a main block fronted by a prominent steeple, matching transepts, and a large apse at the rear and is set on a solid foundation. It features a side-gable roof, covered with wood shingles and supported by square wood posts braced by wood brackets, The façade includes four-light wood casement windows and paired ten-light wood casement windows, and the side elevations have paired six- and eight-light wood casement windows. The steeple is comprised of a square sandstone tower that rises to an eight-sided spire, which is covered with wood shingles.
A prominent clock is set beneath the spire of the west elevation. Completed after nine years of work by local masons and carpenters, construction of the church buildings was funded by a gift from philanthropists Paul and Rachel Mellon to Meade Parish. The building features an array of fine detailing by local and European craftsmen, including stained glass by Amsterdam master Joep Nicholas; six bells cast in England; the exquisite “Peace Angels” wrought iron piece donated by a thirteenth-century church in Dresden, Germany; brass and iron work from England, France, Poland, and Spain; and wooden pews, pulpit, and columns sculpted by Heinz Warneke, a professor at George Washington University’s Corcoran School of Art and Design, best known for his work on the National Cathedral in Washington, D.C. Construction was finally completed in 1960. Standing across the courtyard approximately 95 feet west of the church is the Peard House, the Trinity Episcopal Church Rectory (030-5438-0042). The church cemetery located on the north end of the property leads to open, church-owned lands in neighboring Loudoun County.

=== Miscellaneous ===
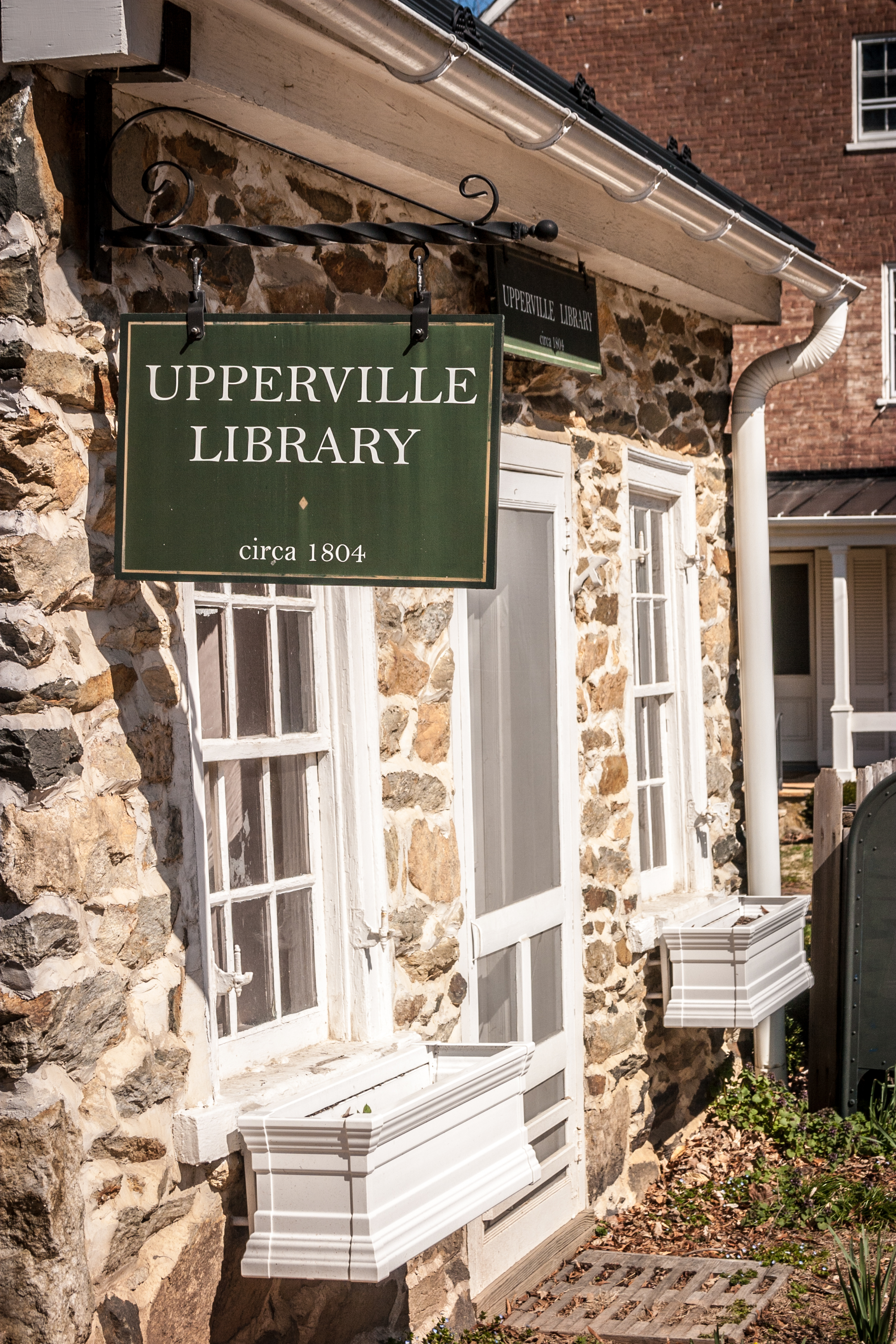
Upperville Library (c.1804), with the Keith House (c. 1826) in the background

The Gulick House (c.1830), located on the opposite side of VA Rte. 50, served as the church's rectory prior to construction of the Pearn House/Rectory (c.1951). Still owned by the church, the former is now a rental property.

Pearn House (c.1951), built as the Rectory, is located on the west side of the courtyard and now houses the church offices. Directly north of it is a 19th-century wood-framed house that was saved from demolition and relocated to the site. This housed the Church School until the building of Cox Hall.

Since May 1960, Trinity Church has hosted an annual fund-raiser, the Hunt Country Stable Tour. Neighboring horse farms open their stables to the public; ticket-buyers are given a map, and drive themselves from farm to farm. Luncheon is served in the church's parish hall.

The Piedmont Child Care Center opened in the basement of the church's parish hall in October 1984, and continues to provide care forty years later. The Community Music School of the Piedmont has had its headquarters in the church's parish hall since 1994, and offers classes and music therapy sessions.

Trinity Church's logo is an image of the brass rooster wind vane at the top of its spire. On Saturdays, volunteers staff the "Golden Rooster Thrift Shop," located in the Keith House (c.1826), at the northwest corner of VA Rte. 50 & Lafayette Street.

Just west of the Keith House is the tiny Upperville Library (c.1804), which once served as a doctor's office.

=== Heinz Warneke ===
The Mellon family donated the Mellon Bay to the National Cathedral in Washington, D.C. This was dedicated on May 9, 1952, in memory of Andrew W. Mellon, who had served as United States Secretary of the Treasury from 1921 to 1932. In 1936, Andrew W. Mellon donated $10,000,000 to build the National Gallery of Art, and pledged to give his art collection to the American people. In January 1952, sculptor Heinz Warneke was commissioned to design and model twelve capitals for the columns of the cathedral's Mellon Bay. He created whimsical neo-medieval capitals of "frolicking animals and lush vegetation". One capital featured the portico of the National Gallery of Art.

Warneke's work on the Mellon Bay brought him to the attention of Paul and Bunny Mellon. Their architect for Trinity Church, H. Page Cross, began working with Warneke on church furniture in 1957. Cross designed the wood pulpit, for which Warneke carved figures of five great preachers (1957-58). Warneke and an assistant carved 38 pew ends in wood (1957-59), each based on a flower or plant native to Virginia. Warneke designed and modeled animal figures for the capitals of the two limestone columns in the transepts (1961-64), and did the same for the four limestone impost blocks at the corners of the church's crossing.

==== Trinity Church sculpture ====
- Church furniture (1957-65, carved wood)
  - Pulpit (1957-58, carved wood). The pulpit is ringed by 5 carved figures of famous preachers: St. Chrysostom, Martin Luther, John Donne, Jonathan Edwards, Phillips Brooks.
  - 38 Pew ends (1957-59, carved wood). Each pew end is carved with a plant variety native to Virginia—Oak, Wheat, Ferns, Grapes, Dogwood, Pear, Thistle, Holly, Columbine, Rose, Trillium, Ivy, Cherry, Lily. The 14 plant carvings are repeated over the 38 pew ends, 19 on each side of the center aisle.
  - Suffer Little Children Flower Pedestal (1962-65, carved wood) Jesus walking with 2 small children.
- Column capitals and impost blocks (1961-64, carved limestone). Both transepts feature a double arch, carried on two carved impost blocks inset into the walls and a center column with a carved capital.
  - Column capital, North Transept: Unicorn, symbolizing Purity and Incarnation
  - Column capital, South Transept: Pelicans, symbolizing the Sacrifice of Christ and the Missionary Church
  - Impost block: Fish, symbolizing Christ
  - Northwest impost block: Sparrows, symbolizing the Lowly People
  - Impost block: Owls, symbolizing Wisdom and Satan
  - Impost block: Griffin, symbolizing Persecution and the Savior

== Cemetery ==
Paul Mellon (1907-1999) and Rachel Lambert "Bunny" Mellon (1910-2014) are buried together in the church cemetery. His parents, Andrew W. Mellon and Nora McMullen Mellon, were re-interred in the cemetery; as was his first wife, Mary Conover Mellon.

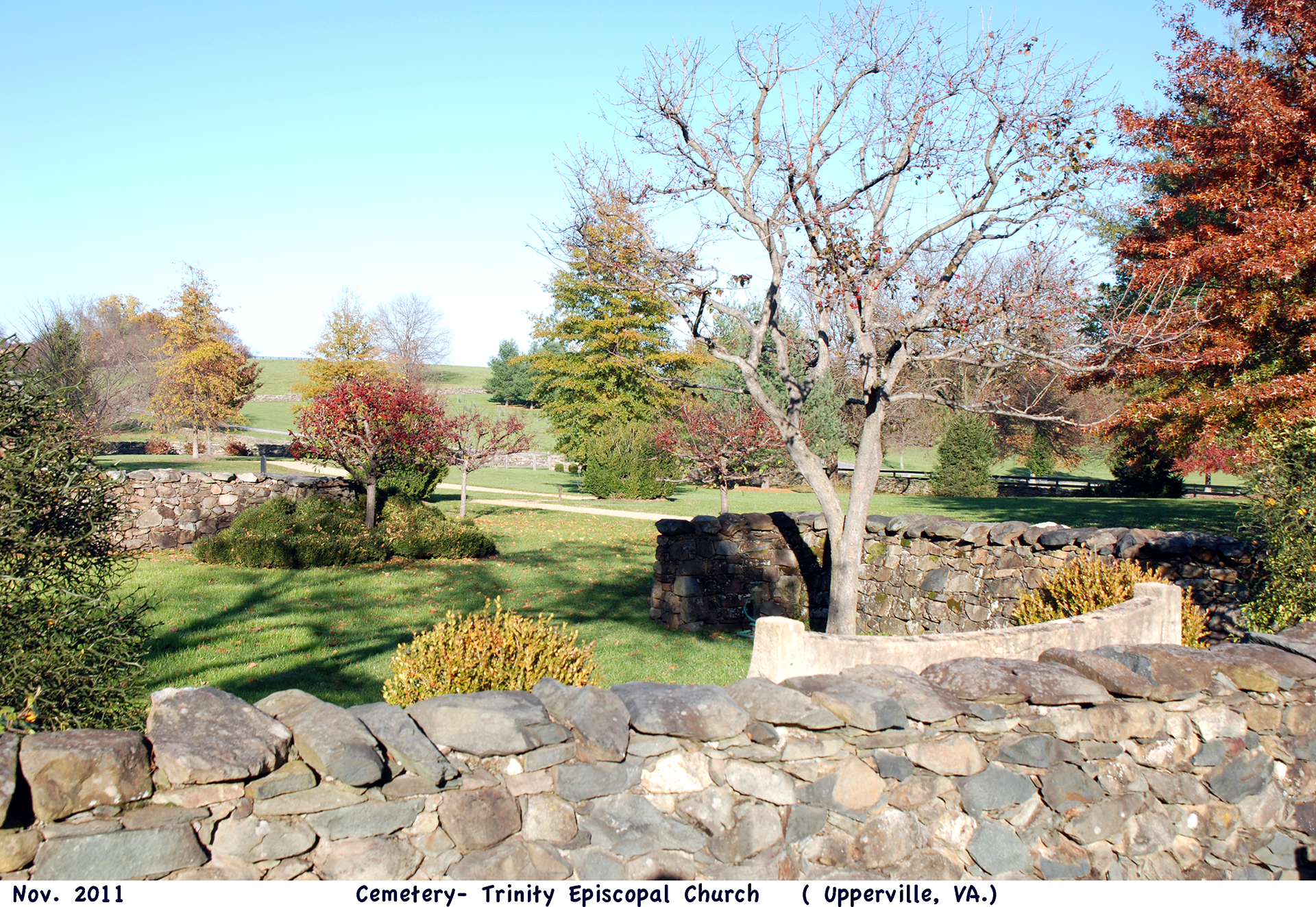

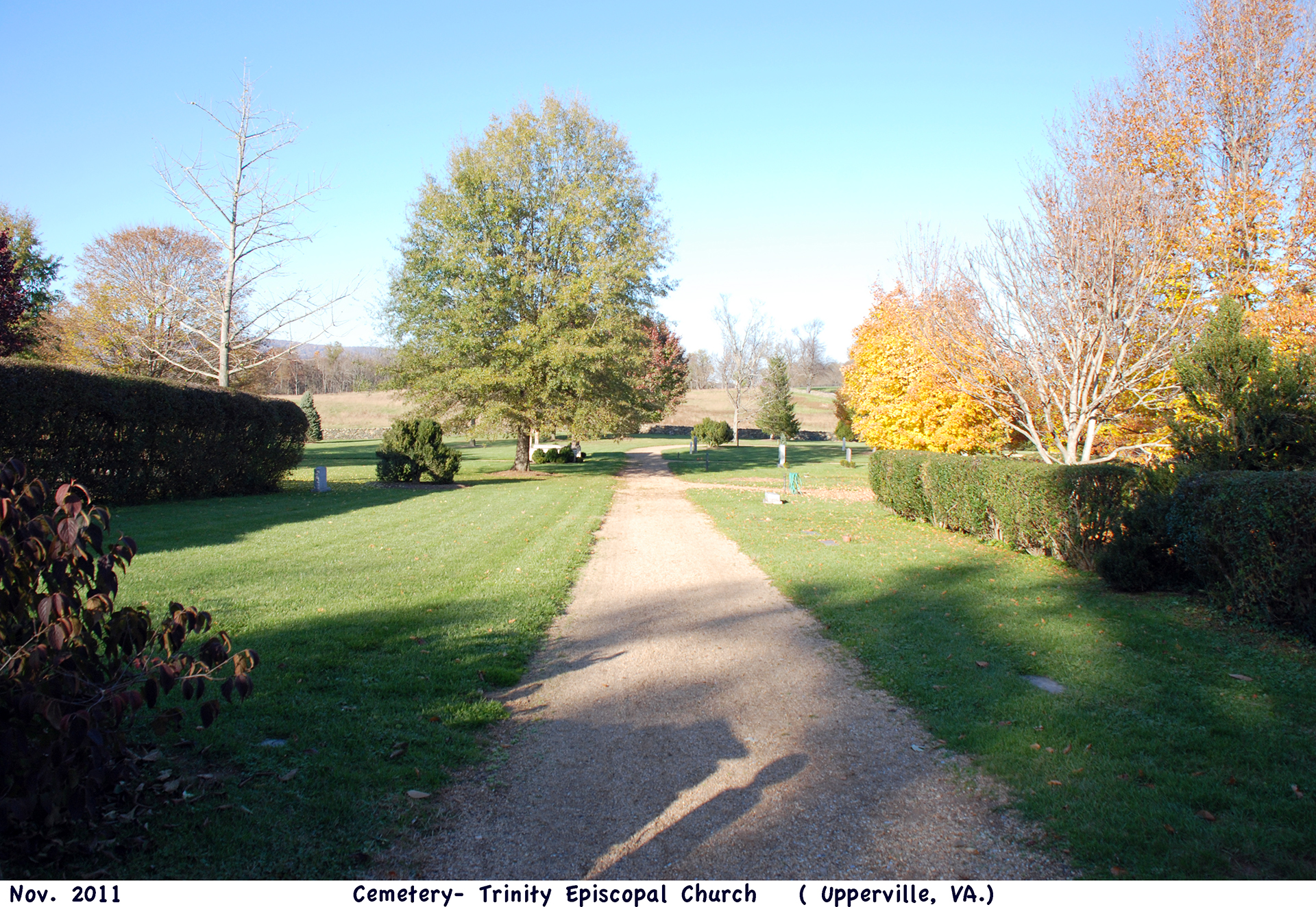

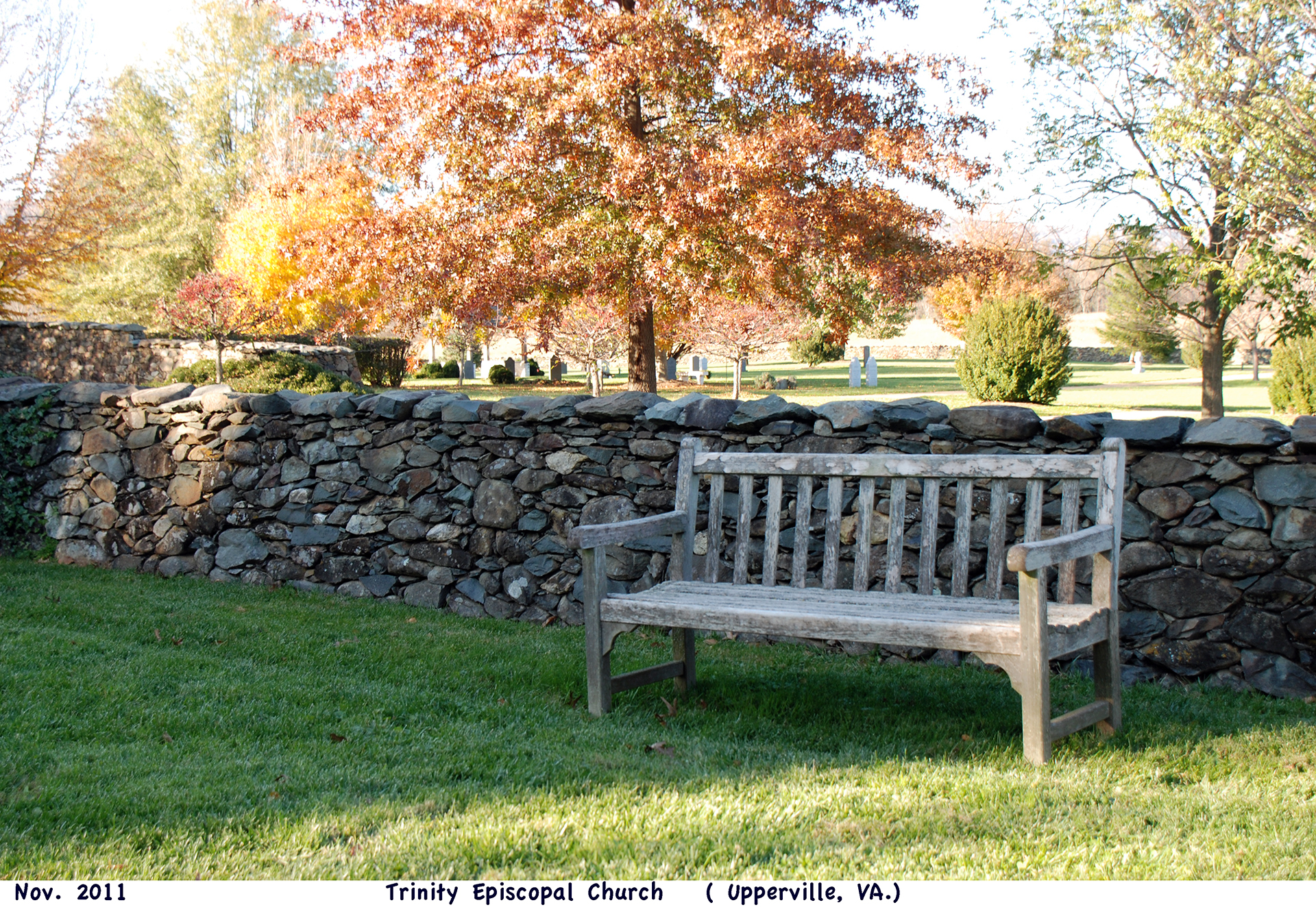

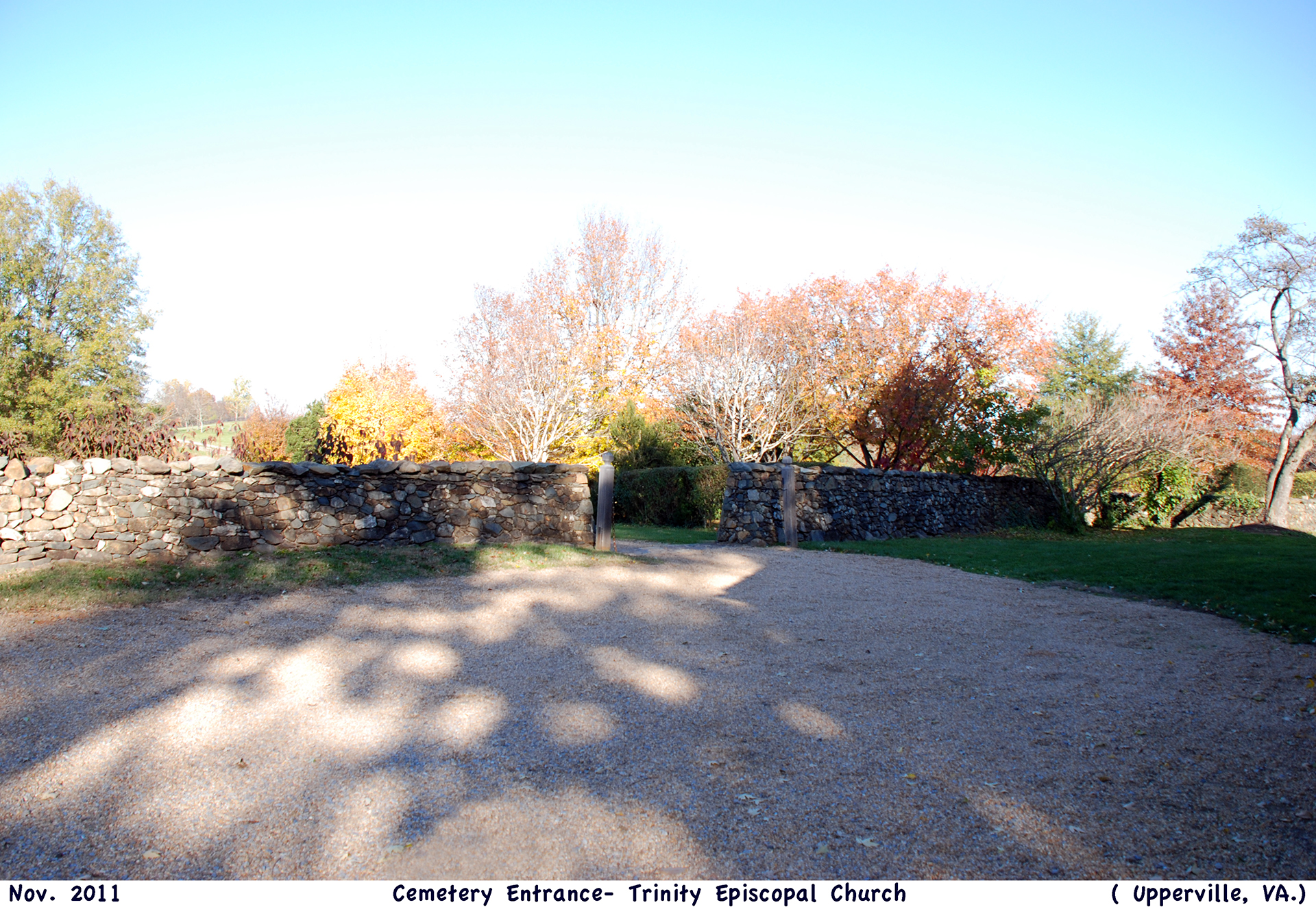
