= Henry T. Oxnard =

American entrepreneur (1860–1922)

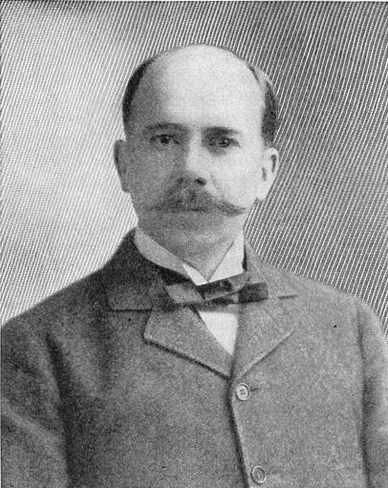
- Oxnard in a 1902 publication
- Born: Henry Thomas Oxnard; June 23, 1860; Marseille, France
- Died: June 8, 1922 (aged 61); New York City, New York, U.S.
- Resting place: Mount Olivet Cemetery; Washington, D.C.
- Citizenship: United States
- Education: Harvard College
- Occupations: Businessman, Thoroughbred racehorse owner/breeder
- Board member of: American Beet Sugar Association
- Spouse: Marie Pichon (m. 1900)
- Children: 2
- Honors: Oxnard, California, Oxnard Street, Los Angeles

Henry Thomas Oxnard (June 23, 1860 – June 8, 1922) was a French-born American entrepreneur and namesake of Oxnard, California, and its Henry T. Oxnard Historic District. Oxnard was president of both the American Beet Sugar Company (which later changed its name to American Crystal Sugar Company) and the American Beet Sugar Association, which represents all the beet sugar factories in the United States. He and his brothers controlled five sugar factories in the United States.

== Early life ==
Henry Thomas Oxnard was born to Adeline (née Brown) and Thomas A. Oxnard. He had three brothers, Robert, Benjamin A. and James G. In 1860, Oxnard's French-born father sold his sugar cane plantations and refinery in Louisiana, and by doing so was able to escape the business risks of the American Civil War by returning to his native France, where Henry was born in Marseille the year before the Civil War started. The family returned to the United States, where Henry Oxnard grew up in Massachusetts and attended Harvard College.

== Career ==
In 1889, Oxnard and his associates established a beet sugar refinery in Grand Island, Nebraska. In 1891, two more plants were built in Chino, California, and Norfolk, Nebraska, and one in Rocky Ford, Colorado. In 1899, Oxnard opened a factory in Ventura County, California. The area around the plant later would become the town of Oxnard.

In July 1904 Oxnard was described by The San Francisco Sunday Call as "one of the manipulators and dictators of beet sugar businesses and policies" in America, small, pugnacious, energetic, and practical."

== Thoroughbred horse racing ==
Henry Oxnard raced Thoroughbred horses under the nom de course Albemarle Stable. In 1902 he hired future Hall of Fame inductee R. Wyndham Walden to train his stable of horses.

In 1903, Henry Oxnard purchased the 517 acre Blue Ridge Farm in Upperville, Virginia, where he established a Thoroughbred breeding operation. In 2006, the farm was designated for its historical significance by the Virginia Landmarks Register and the National Register of Historic Places.

Many involved in the horse racing industry were greatly harmed by the 1908 Hart–Agnew Law, which led to the closing of all racing in New York state in 1911 and 1912. A February 21, 1913, ruling by the New York Supreme Court, Appellate Division saw horse racing return in 1913. Prior to the restart, that April Henry Oxnard and other wealthy industry leaders created the "Owners Fund" to cover losses for 1913 and 1914 incurred by those less fortunate who might need financial assistance while attempting to get back on their feet again.

== Personal life ==
In 1900, Henry Oxnard married Marie Pichon with whom he had two daughters, Adeline (1901) who was named for her paternal grandmother, and Nadine (1903).

== Death ==
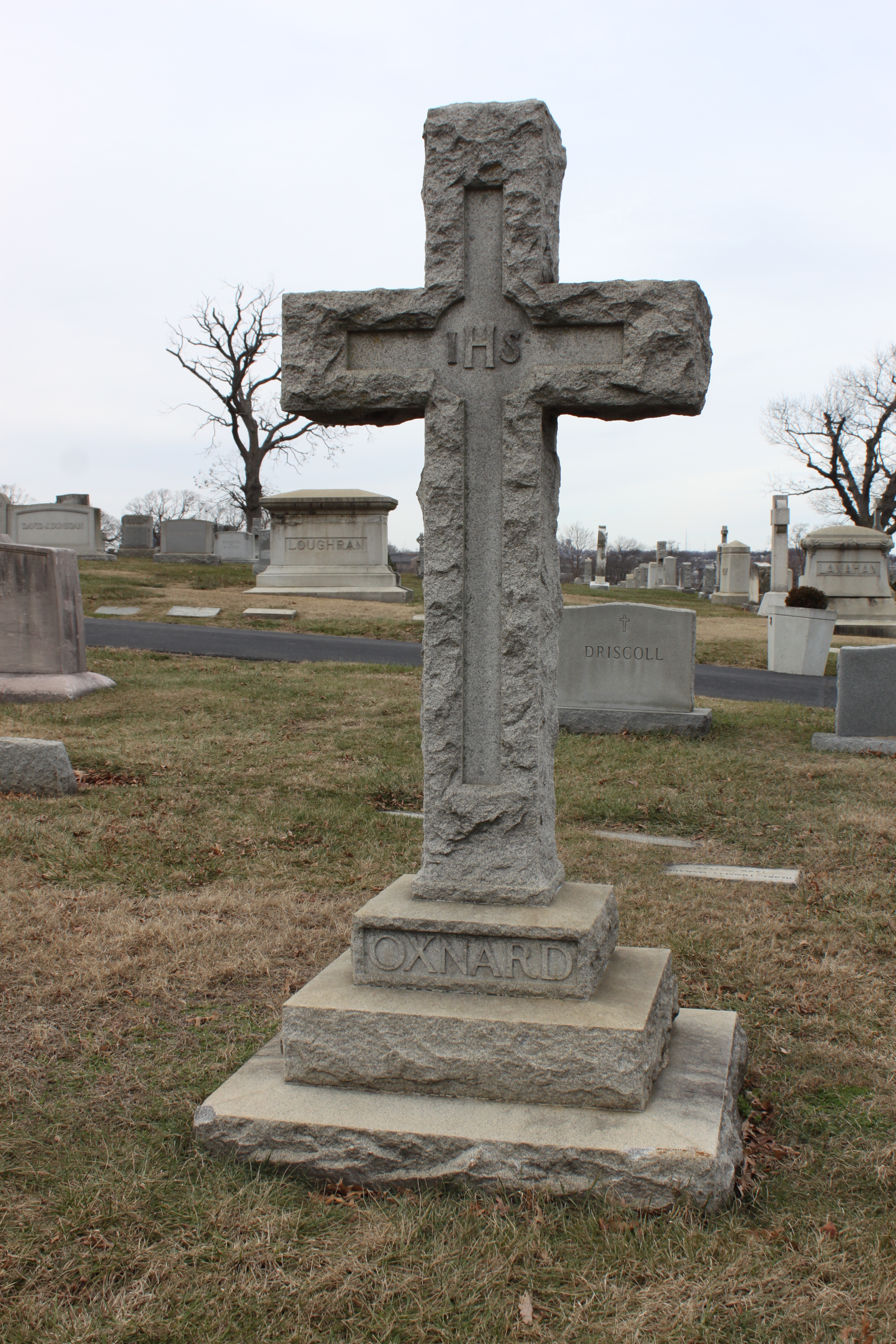
Grave of Oxnard at Mount Olivet Cemetery

Henry Oxnard died on June 8, 1922, in New York City. He is interred at Mount Olivet Cemetery in Washington, D.C.
