= Upperville United Methodist Church =

Historic church in Virginia, United States

- U.S. Historic district – Contributing property
- Location within Virginia Location within the United States
- Location: VA 712, 0.1 mi. S of US 50, Upperville, Virginia
- Coordinates: 38°59′35.3″N 77°53′07.3″W
- Built: 1833
- Part of: Upperville Historic District (ID72001394)
- Designated CP: October 18, 1972

Upperville United Methodist Church is a historic church in Upperville, Virginia, United States, on Delaplane Grade Road, just off U.S. Route 50. The single-room church is a brick structure built in 1832, with 15-foot-high windows on its side. During the Civil War, it was used as a hospital, as were many other local churches. Originally, the church had a slave balcony wrapping around its whole length, but the balcony was destroyed during the war to use for firewood, and was later partially rebuilt. The cornerstone near the top of the building reads "METHODIST E. CHURCH. DEDICATED NOVEMBER 3, 1833."

The church is part of the Upperville Historic District, which was added to the National Register of Historic Places in 1972.
