= Green Garden =

Green Garden may refer to:

- "Green Garden" (song), by Laura Mvula
- Green Garden Township, Ellsworth County, Kansas, United States
- Green Garden Township, Will County, Illinois, United States
- Green Garden (Upperville, Virginia), United States, a historic house and farm
- Rashtriya Dalit Prerna Sthal and Green Garden, India
