= The Community Music School of the Piedmont =

Music school in Upperville, Virginia

Coordinates: 38°59′38.6″N 77°52′52.4″W

The Community Music School of the Piedmont (also known as CMSP) is a private, non-profit music school headquartered in Upperville, Virginia, United States. Other locations include: Middleburg, Purcellville, The Plains, and Aldie. CMSP is an independent institution established in 1994 by Middleburg residents Martha Cotter and Shannon Davis. Cotter continues to serve as Executive Director. Today, there are more than 350 students enrolled in the CMSP, ranging in age from 10 months to 75 years. Students come from several counties in the Northern Virginia area, all of them in the most westerly part of the greater Washington, DC area.

== History ==
The Community Music School of the Piedmont (CMSP) has been in operation in Virginia since 1994. It is a non-profit organization that enjoys status as a tax-exempt charitable organization under section 501 (c) 3 of the Internal Revenue Service code. The school offers a wide range of group classes, ensemble programs, individual instruction, and music therapy. In addition, it provides a variety of scholarship opportunities to qualified students. CMSP is a member of the National Guild of Community Schools of Arts Education and Associated Chamber Music Players. For the past 10 years, CMSP has been a recipient of grants from The Virginia Commission for the Arts and The National Endowment for the Arts.

== Locations ==
CMSP is headquartered at Cox Hall, the parish hall of Trinity Episcopal Church in Upperville, Virginia. The school has a variety of satellite locations throughout Loudoun, Fauquier, and surrounding counties. These locations are: Aldie, Middleburg, Purcellville, The Plains, Waterford, and Stephens City.

Many churches in the region share their space with CMSP. Beginning with the generosity of Trinity Church, the school's space-sharing model has evolved and expanded over the years, enabling CMSP to keep its occupancy expenses to a minimum, while at the same time funding a generous scholarship program.

== Programs ==
- Music Together: (birth to four years) Music Together is a licensed music education program for very young children and their parents or caregivers. Classes include an artistically conceived flow of songs, movement, nursery rhymes, instrumental jam sessions and finger plays. These activities help children to develop rhythm and tonal skills. This series is given four times each year at four CMSP locations. Classes are held in the mornings and afternoons.
- Early Childhood Music: (Infant to five years) An outreach program conducted at the Piedmont Childcare Center. It presents a specially designed curriculum for the childcare center. Children explore sounds, rhythms, and music patterns through songs, movement, and instrumental play. This program of ten classes is offered in the fall and spring with an abbreviated version in the summer. Classes are held during the school day.
- After School Music: An outreach program conducted on site at local public elementary schools in collaboration with the school's Parent Teacher Organizations, providing class instruction.

== Annual Candlelight Concerts ==
During the winter months, CMSP holds its Annual Candlelight Concert. Started in 2008, the concert is a fundraising event to raise money for student scholarships, community outreach programs and faculty development initiatives. Featured artists in this series:

- 2020 Ari Isaacman-Beck & Gwen Krosnick
- 2019 Donovan Stokes
- 2018 Brian Ganz
- 2017 Amit Peled
- 2016 Rosa Lamoreaux
- 2015 NOW - New Orchestra of Washington
- 2014 J. Reilly Lewis & Members of the Washington Bach Consort
- 2013 Time for Three
- 2012 J. Reilly Lewis & Members of the Washington Bach Consort
- 2011 John O'Conor
- 2010 David Hardy & Lambert Orkis
- 2009 John O'Conor & the Royal Irish Academy of Music Symphony Orchestra
