= Henry T. Oxnard Historic District =

Historic district in California, United States

- U.S. National Register of Historic Places
- U.S. Historic district
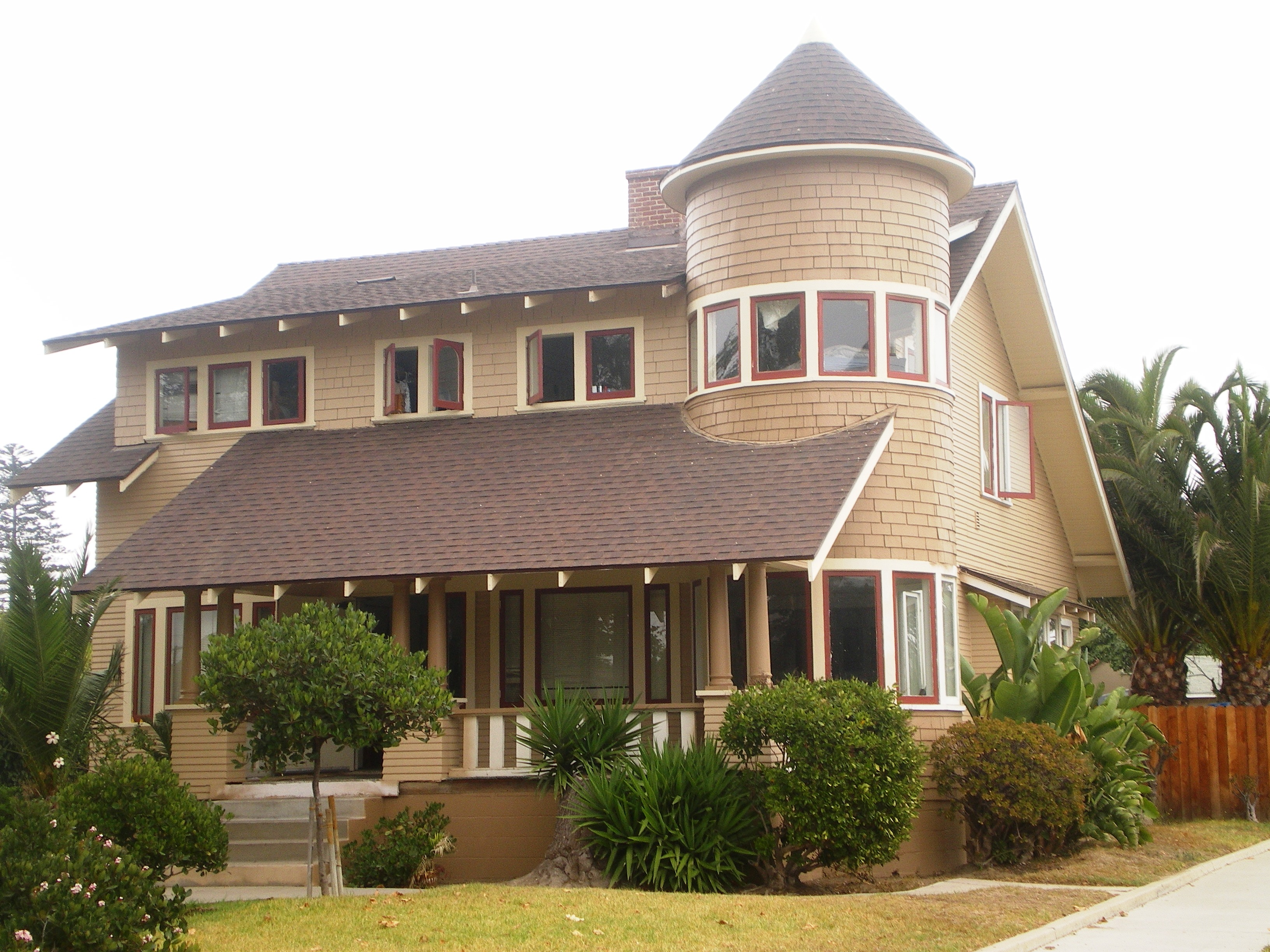
- House at F and 5th

- Location within California Location within the United States
- Location: F and G sts., between Palm and 5th sts., Oxnard, California
- Coordinates: 34°12′03″N 119°11′10″W
- Area: 70 acres (28 ha)
- Built: 1925
- Architect: Priest, A.F.; Martin Sr., A.C.
- Architectural style: Mission/spanish Revival, Bungalow/craftsman, Colonial Revival
- NRHP reference No.: 99000109
- Added to NRHP: February 5, 1999

The Henry T. Oxnard Historic District is a 70-acre (28 ha) historic district that was listed on the National Register of Historic Places in 1999. Covering approximately F and G streets, between Palm and 5th streets, in the downtown core of Oxnard, California, the district includes 139 contributing buildings and includes homes mostly built before 1925. It includes Mission/Spanish Revival, Bungalow/craftsman, Colonial Revival, and other architecture. It includes five Prairie School and eight Tudor Revival homes.

It consists of the houses built in two sub-divisions: the Henry T. Oxnard tract on F Street and the Walter H. Lathrop tract on G Street, which were built during 1909-1941 and with the "vast majority" built before 1925. The two streets of homes are contiguous and "make an intact neighborhood that has remained unchanged for more than 70 years.... While many neighboring streets have some historic homes this is the only area that is unchanged and still has the spirit and feeling of the original turn-of-the-century city of Oxnard."

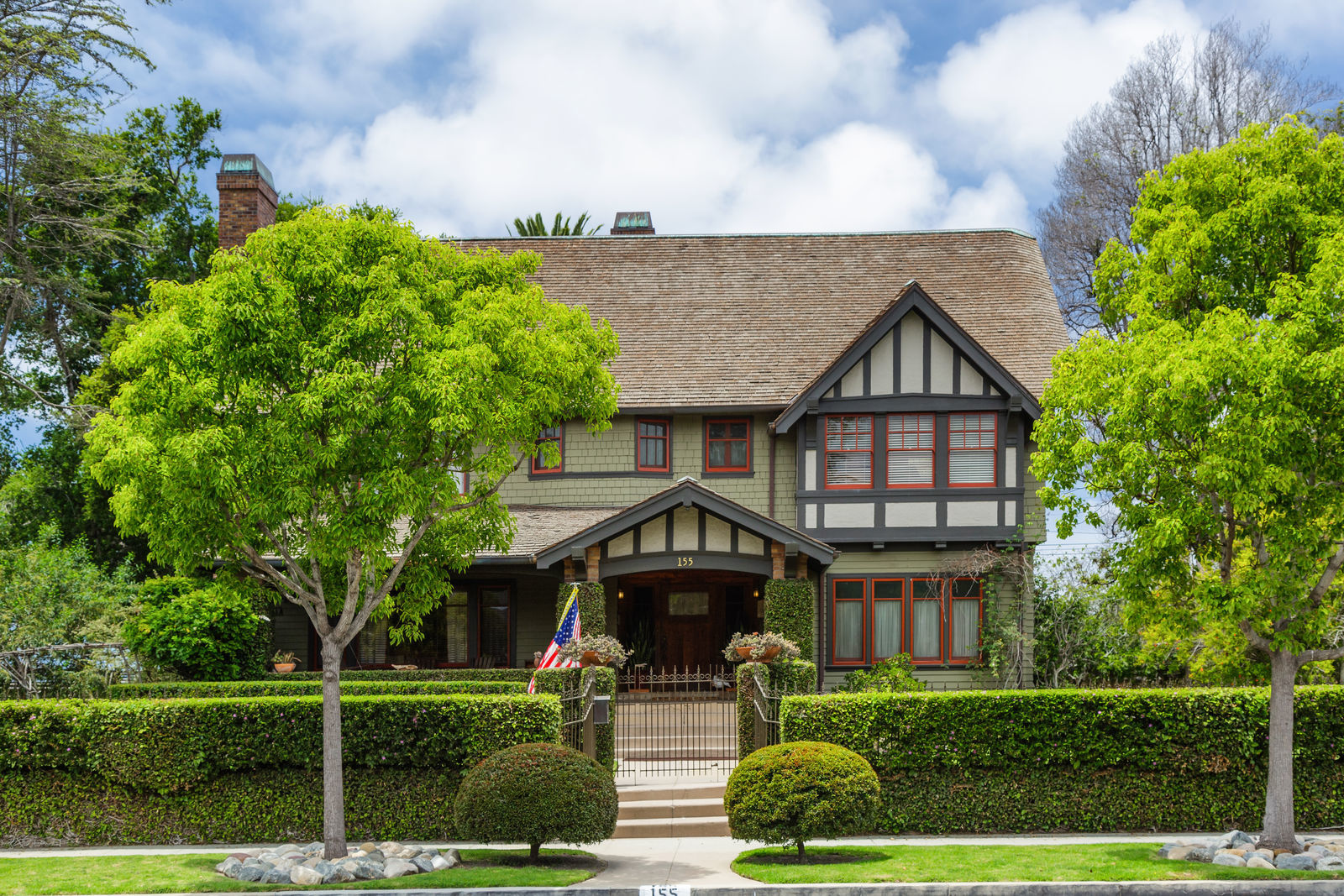
Henry Levy House

The district was developed in part by a number of Jewish immigrants from Alsace, France, whose families built businesses in Hueneme and then also in Oxnard. These include Moise L. Wolff, Paul Lehmann (an owner of Lehman Brothers), Samuel Weill, and brothers-in-law Achille and Henry Levy. Samuel Weill, a partner in the Murphy & Weill Merchandise and Grocery of Oxnard built a large residence at 125 N. F street in the district; Henry Levy built a large Craftsman/Tudor-style house at 155 S. G Street. Also at least eight cashiers, tellers, and bookkeepers employed at the Bank of A. Levy or at a business of Henry Levy owned and/or occupied smaller homes in the district.

== Neighborhood ==
The nearby J.A. Swartz Residence on 5th Street is among the finer examples of the Spanish Colonial Revival style among homes in the downtown core. Henry Levy House is a contributing property.

== See also ==
- National Register of Historic Places listings in Ventura County, California
- Ventura County Historic Landmarks & Points of Interest
