= Blue Ridge Farm (Upperville, Virginia) =

Historic house in Virginia, United States

- U.S. National Register of Historic Places
- Virginia Landmarks Register
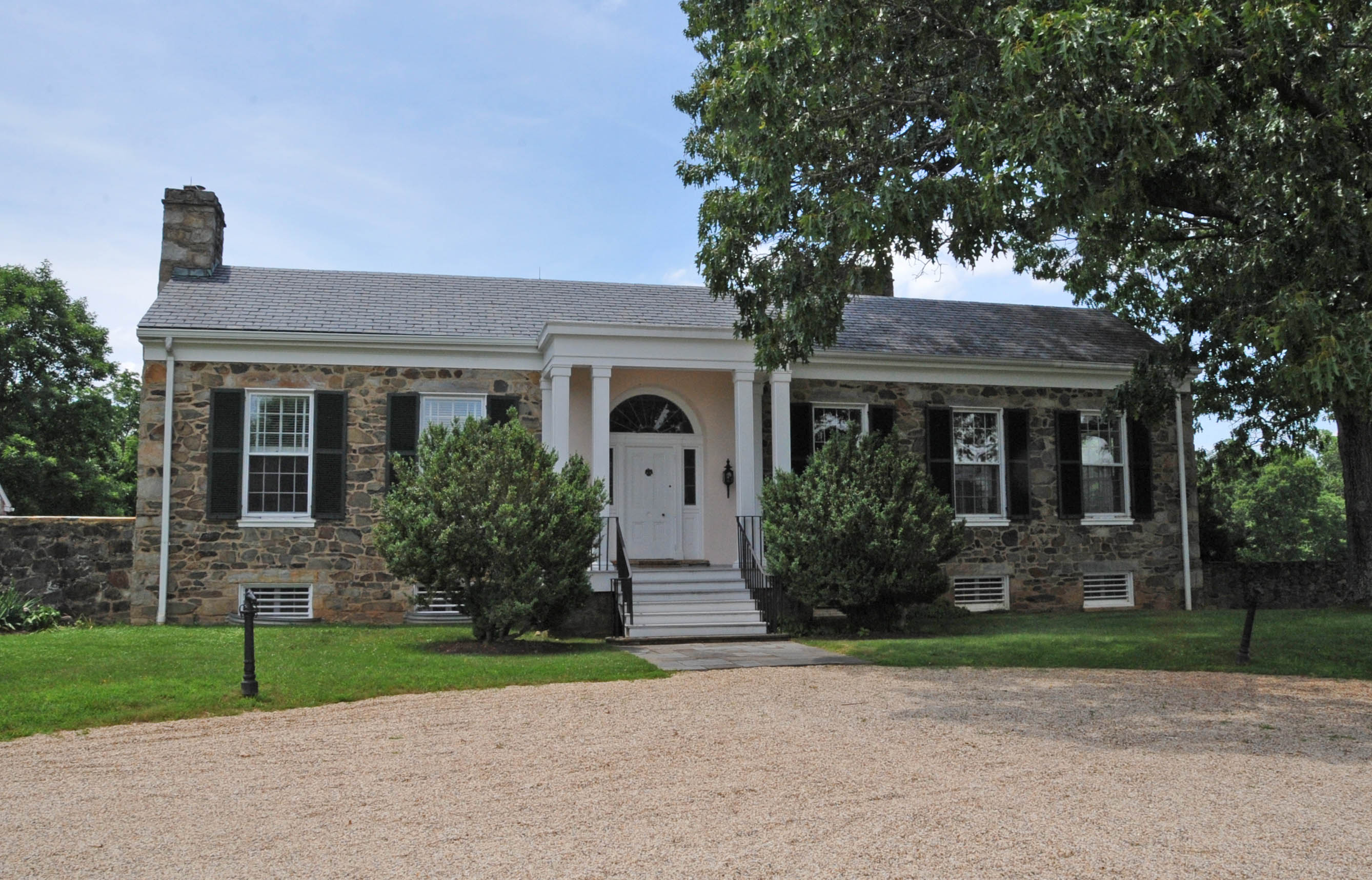
- Blue Ridge Farmhouse, built 1935 (2007)

- Location within Northern Virginia Location within Virginia Location within the United States
- Location: 1799 Blue Ridge Farm Rd., near Upperville, Virginia
- Coordinates: 38°57′49″N 77°52′42″W
- Area: 517 acres (209 ha)
- Built: 1791
- Architect: Wood, Waddy Butler; Shipman, Ellen Biddle, et al.
- Architectural style: Federal, Colonial Revival
- NRHP reference No.: 06000753
- VLR No.: 030-0894

Significant dates
- Added to NRHP: August 30, 2006
- Designated VLR: June 8, 2006

Blue Ridge Farm is a historic home and farm located near Upperville, Fauquier County, Virginia. Californian Henry T. Oxnard (1860–1922) built a horse breeding operation at Blue Ridge Farm in 1903.

== Overview ==
The property includes a two-story, rubble stone Federal era farmhouse known as Fountain Hill House (c. 1791) and its associated outbuildings and two contributing sites; a one-story Colonial Revival-style stone house known as Blue Ridge Farmhouse (1935) and its associated outbuildings, and formal landscape features around it; two tenant houses (Crawford House and Byington House, c. 1903); and several buildings associated with the farm's horse breeding industry, including three large broodmare stables (c. 1903); two stallion stables (stud barns, c. 1913); training stables, and an implement shed.

The property was purchased by Rear Admiral Cary Travers Grayson in 1928. The Blue Ridge Farmhouse was designed for him by Washington, D.C. architect Waddy B. Wood.

Among Grayson's successful horses, Fluvanna was voted the retrospective American Champion Two-Year-Old Filly. In 1938, Grayson's last year, he bred the mare On Hand to Kentucky Derby winner Brokers Tip to produce the colt Market Wise, which went on to become a multiple stakes winner and the 1943 U.S. Co-champion Handicap Horse.

As of 2006 members of the Grayson family still owned the property. It was listed on the National Register of Historic Places in 2006.
