= H. Page Cross =

American architect

Howard Page Cross
- Born: August 23, 1910
- Died: August 28, 1975; New York City, US
- Education: Yale University, Massachusetts Institute of Technology
- Occupation: Architect
- Buildings: Center for Hellenic Studies

Howard Page Cross (August 23, 1910 – August 28, 1975) was an architect who practiced in New York City, active between the years 1945 and 1975. He was notable for having designed in the classical manner during a time when most American architects had abandoned it in favor of modernism.

== Early life and education ==
Cross was born on August 23, 1910, and grew up in New York City. He was the son of John Walter Cross, an architect in the firm Cross and Cross. He graduated from the Groton School (1928) Yale College (Bachelor of Arts, 1932) and the Massachusetts Institute of Technology (Bachelor of Architecture, 1936), and served in the armed forces during World War II as a major in the Marine Corps.

He worked in partnership with his father, as Cross and Son, until 1951, and after his father's death as Page Cross Architect.

Cross died on August 28, 1975, at Lenox Hill Hospital, New York City, following heart surgery.

== Architectural works ==
- Music Building, Foxcroft School (completed 1948).
- Schoolhouse, Foxcroft School (completed 1951).
- Paul and Bunny Mellon Residence, Rokeby Road, Upperville, Virginia (completed 1955).
- Paul and Bunny Mellon Residence, Oyster Harbors Island, Osterville, Massachusetts.
- Trinity Episcopal Church, Upperville, Virginia (completed 1960).
- Addition to the Andrew Mellon Library, Choate Rosemary Hall, Wallingford, Connecticut (completed 1960; 1924 library designed by Edward Purcell Mellon).
- Center for Hellenic Studies, Washington, DC (completed 1963).
- Paul and Bunny Mellon Townhouse, 125 East 70th Street, New York City (completed 1966).
- Paul and Bunny Mellon Residence, Mill Reef Club, Antigua, completed 1968.
- Harding and Mary Lawrence Residence, East End Avenue, New York City (completed 1973 with Billy Baldwin).
- Southampton, New York residence (Completed 1973 with interior designer Anthony Hail).
- Neil McConnell Residence, 8–12 Sutton Square, New York City (alterations 1973).

== Gallery ==
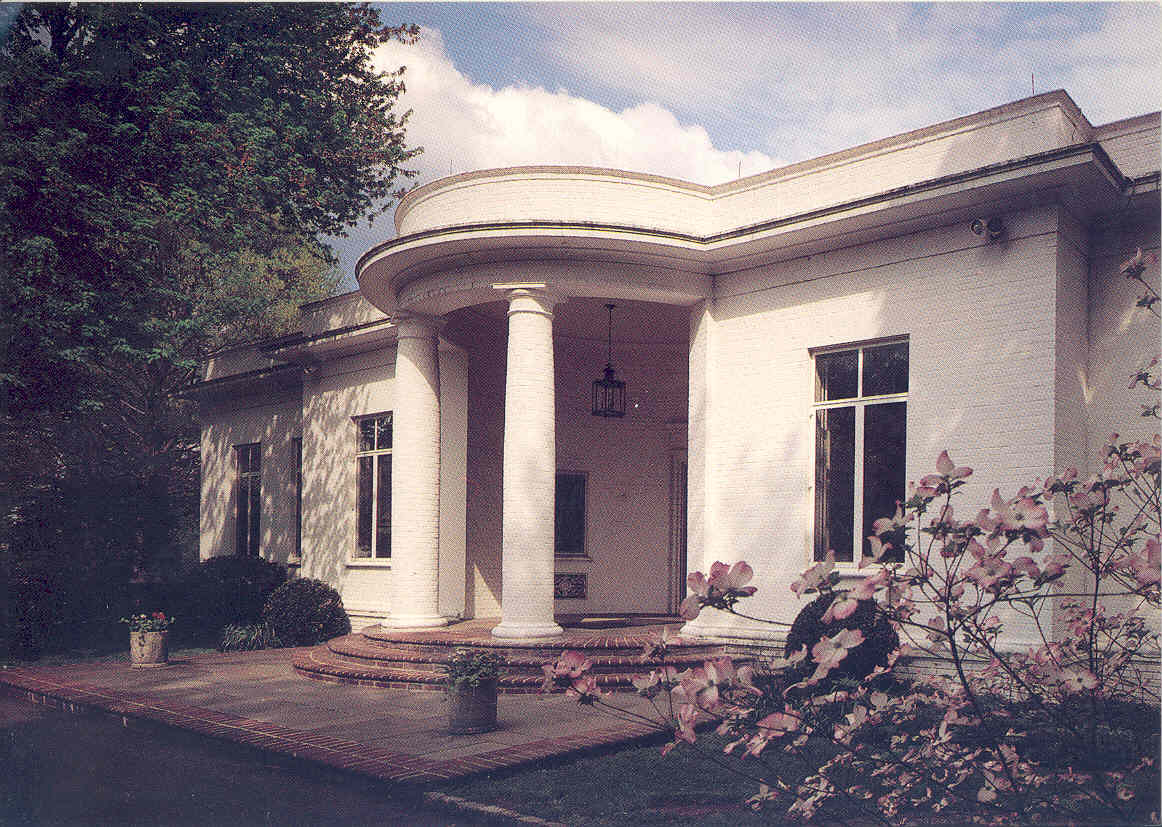
Center for Hellenic Studies, Washington, D.C., completed 1963.

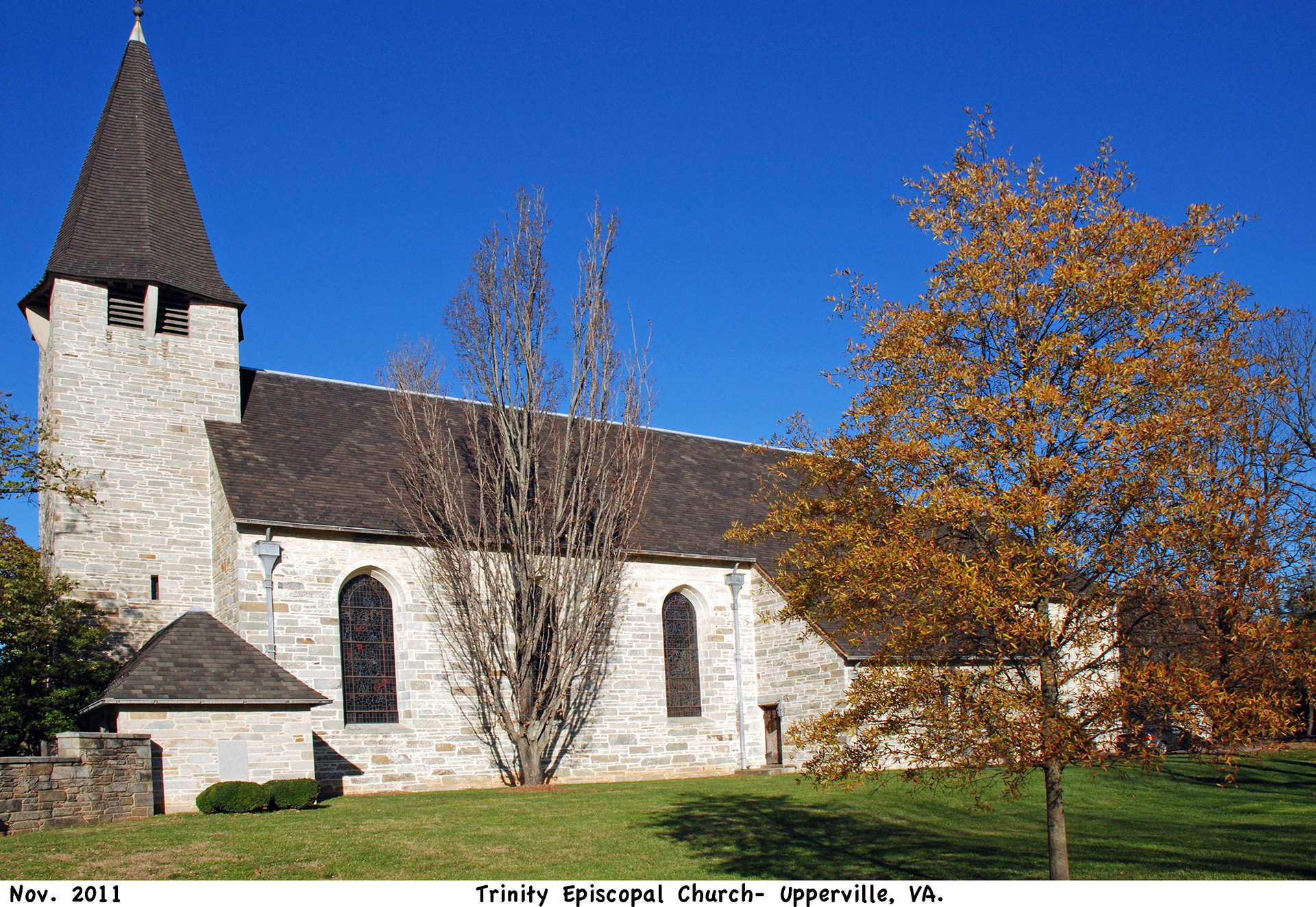
Trinity Episcopal Church

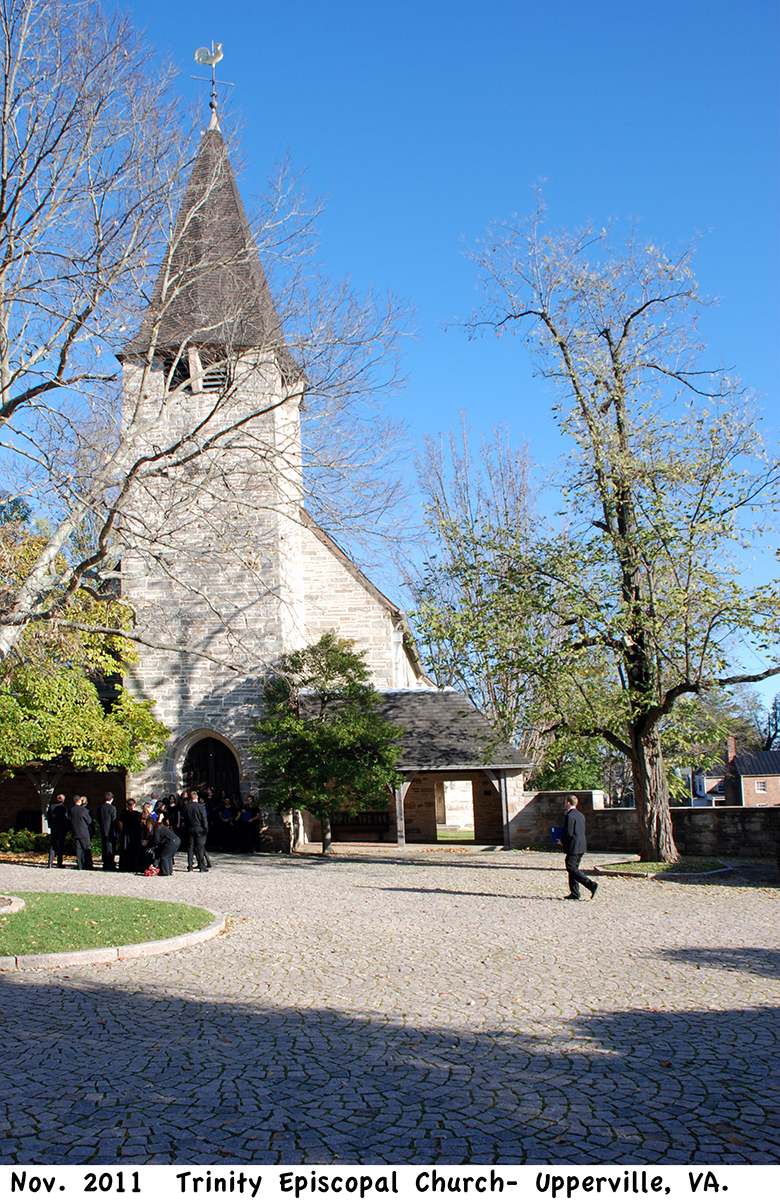
Trinity Episcopal Church

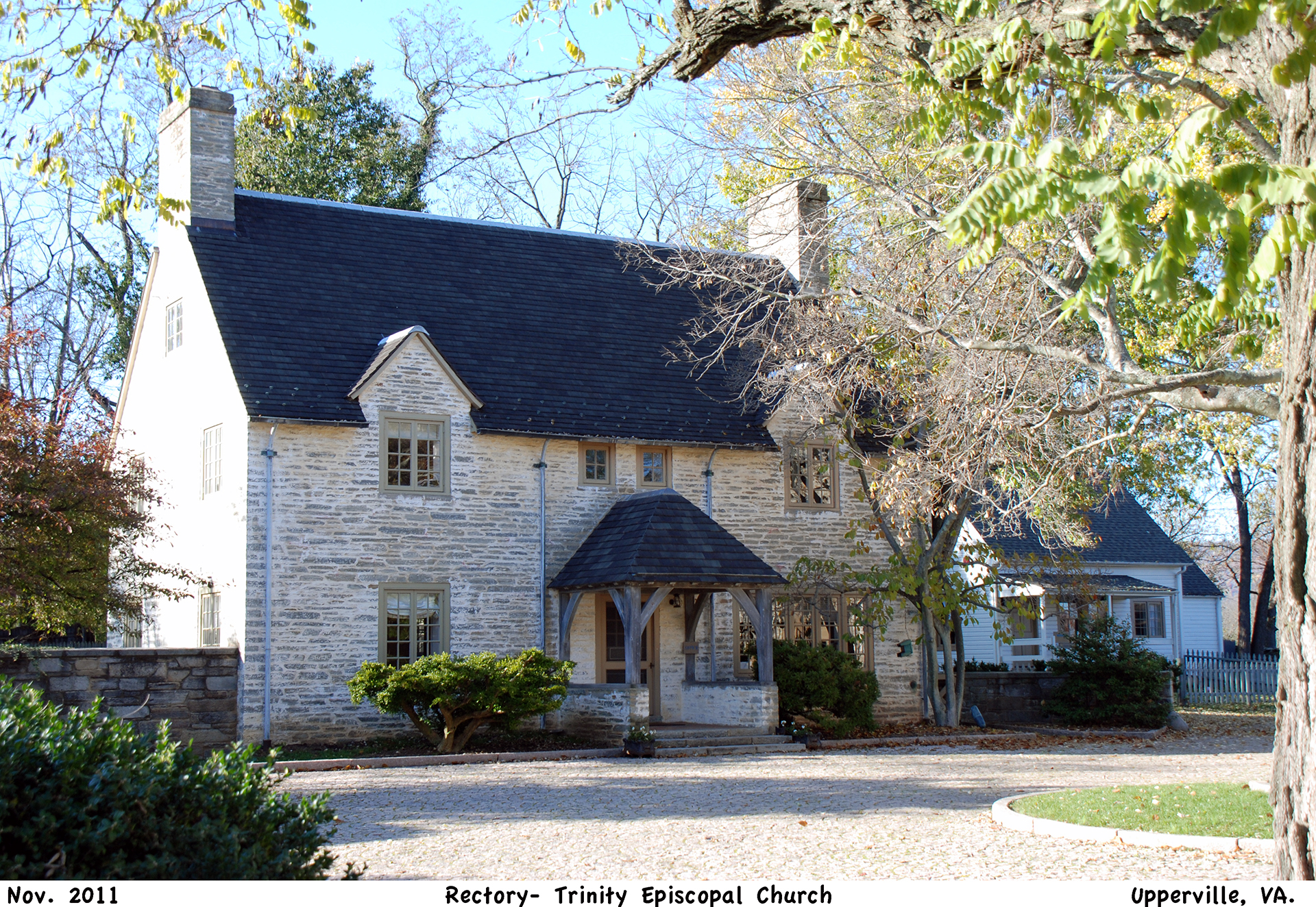
Trinity Church Rectory
