= American Crystal Sugar Company =

American agricultural cooperative

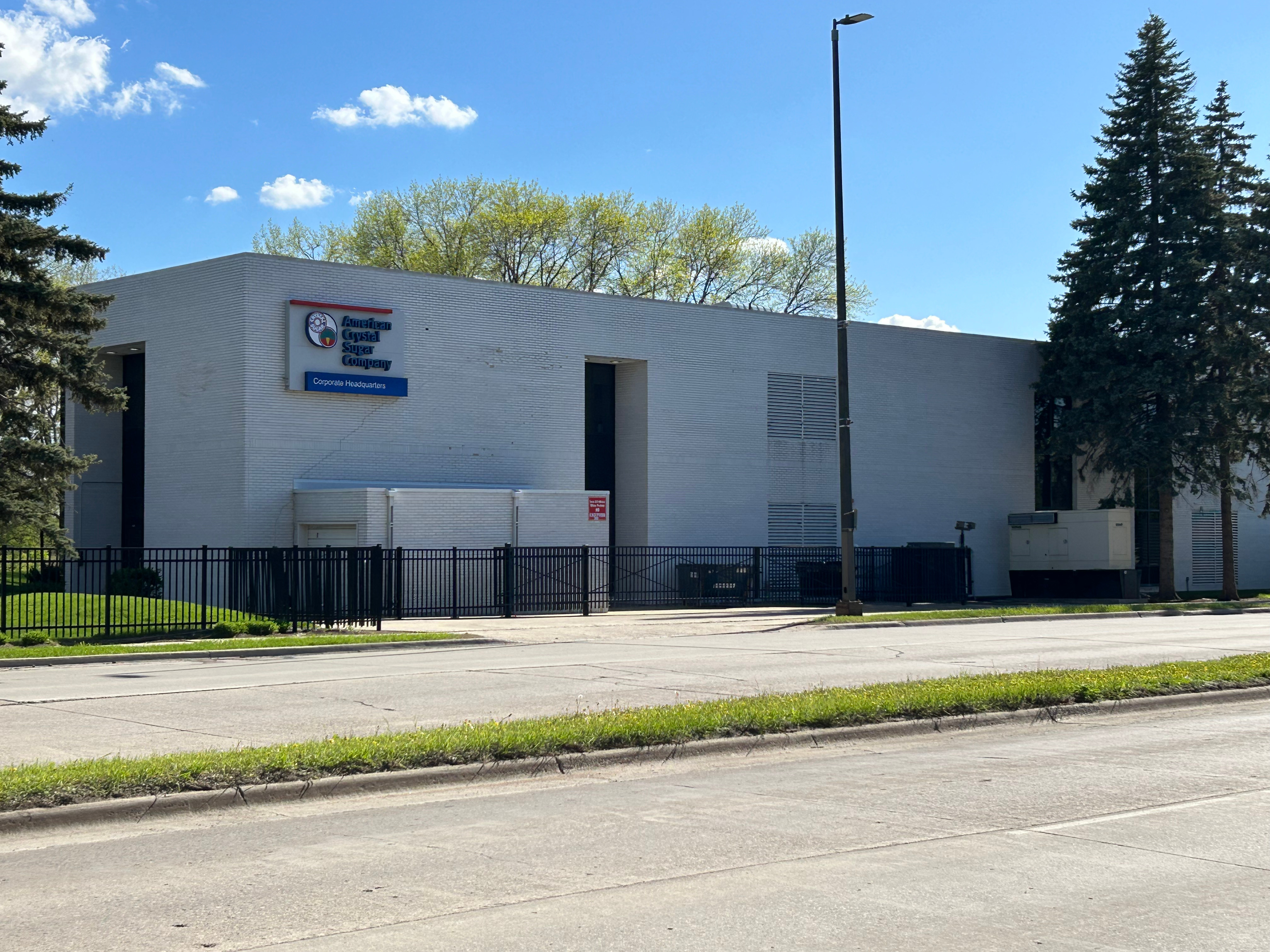
- Type: Agricultural Marketing Cooperative
- Industry: Agriculture
- Founded: 1899; 127 years ago
- Founder: Henry T. Oxnard
- Headquarters: Moorhead, Minnesota, United States
- Area served: Minnesota & North Dakota
- Key people: Thomas Astrup (President & CEO)
- Products: Sugar
- Parent: United Sugars, Midwest Agri-Commodities
- Website: www.crystalsugar.com

American Crystal Sugar Company is an agricultural cooperative specializing in the production of sugar and related agri-products. American Crystal is owned by nearly 2,800 shareholders who raise approximately one-third of the nation's sugarbeet acreage in the Red River valley of Minnesota and North Dakota. As the largest beet sugar producer in the United States, the company sells about 15 percent of America's sugar. American Crystal operates sugar factories in Crookston, East Grand Forks, and Moorhead, Minnesota; and Drayton and Hillsboro, North Dakota. The company's technical services center and corporate headquarters are also located in Moorhead.

Located in Edina, Minnesota, United Sugars Producers & Refiners Cooperative markets American Crystal's sugar to retail and industrial customers throughout the nation. Midwest Agri-Commodities Company, based in San Rafael, California, globally markets American Crystal's agri-products such as sugarbeet pulp, molasses, concentrated separated byproduct (CSB; de-sugared molasses), and betaine.

== History ==
The company was founded as the American Beet Sugar Company by Henry Oxnard in 1899, who combined four separate sugar beet processing plants he had built over the previous decade into a single entity. In 1890, Oxnard had established the Oxnard Beet Sugar Company in Grand Island, Nebraska. The following year he built another plant in Norfolk, Nebraska, the Norfolk Beet Sugar Company, as well as working with his brother Robert to construct the Chino Valley Beet Sugar Company in Chino, California. In 1897 Oxnard built the fourth factory, the Pacific Beet Sugar Company, at Oxnard, California.

Expansion of the company continued, with construction completed on a plant at Rocky Ford, Colorado in 1901.

American Beet Sugar changed its name to American Crystal Sugar in August 1934.

In February 1973, the American Crystal Sugar Company ceased to be a public company when it was bought out by the Red River Valley Sugarbeet Growers Association for $50 million.

ACS opened its Mason City, Iowa, beet sugar factory in 1917 and closed it in 1973. It had come under pressure from the Iowa Water Pollution Control Commission for discharging waste into the Winnebago River and for air pollution, but it was also attributed to financial losses, a new factory at Renville, Minnesota, and fewer acres being grown.

=== Company imposed lockout ===
In August 2011, 96% of American Crystal Sugar employees rejected a pact that would have increased wages 13% over five years (2.5% per year) but which would have demanded greater worker contributions to health insurance coverage and major contract language givebacks, including fewer seniority rights. After five votes over a 20-month period during a company-imposed lockout, 55% of the members of the Bakery, Confectionery, Tobacco Workers and Grain Millers' International Union Local 167G ratified a contract that closely resembled the previous four proposals. After nearly 650 employees quit over the lockout period, only about 400 reported to work following the final vote.
