= Rose Hill Farm (Upperville, Virginia) =

Historic house in Virginia, United States

- U.S. National Register of Historic Places
- Virginia Landmarks Register
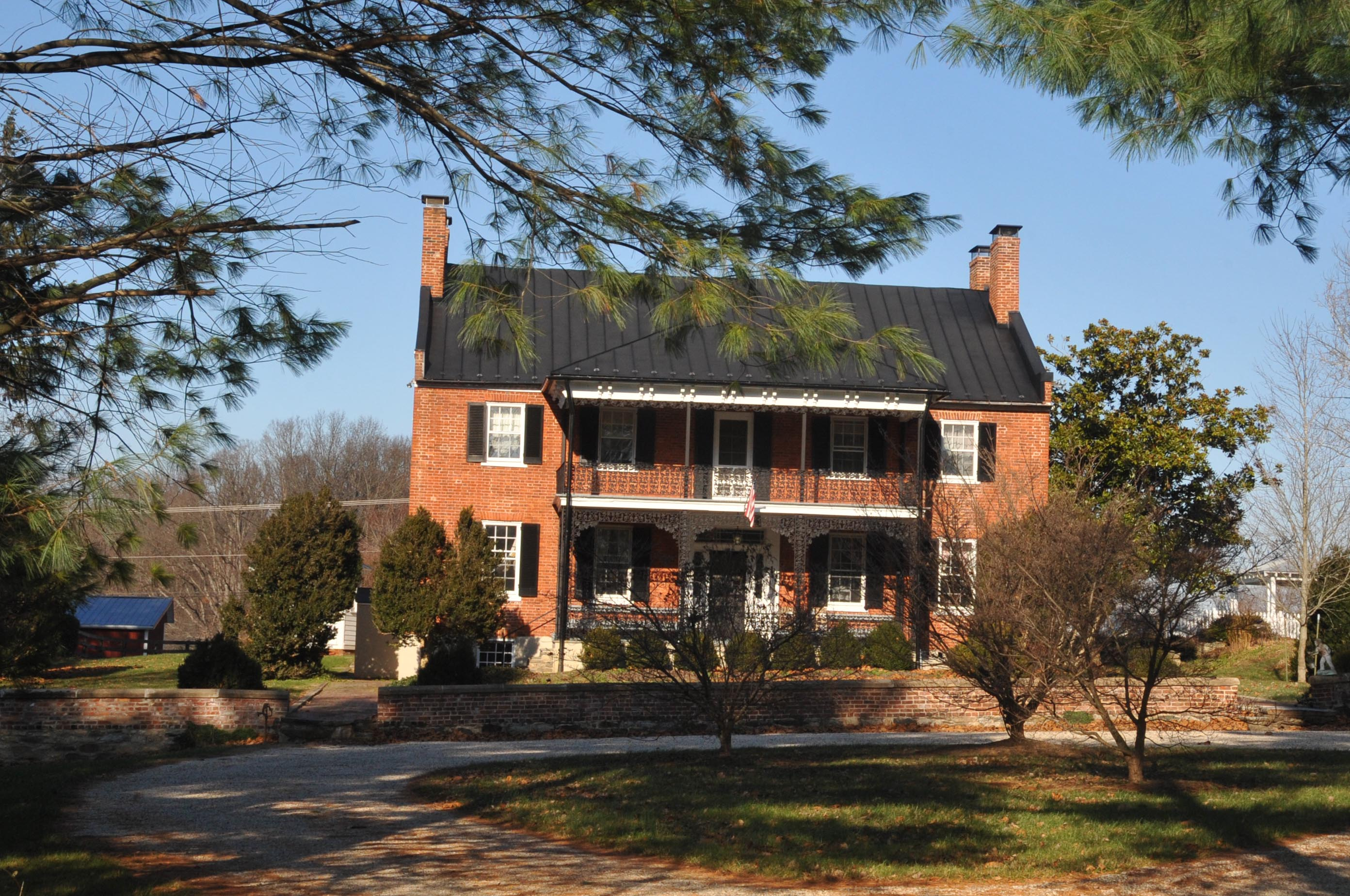

- Location within Northern Virginia Location within Virginia Location within the United States
- Location: North side of US 50, 1.5 miles (2.4 km) west of the junction with VA 713, Upperville, Virginia
- Coordinates: 38°59′01″N 77°49′49″W
- Area: 72 acres (29 ha)
- Built: 1820
- Architectural style: Colonial Revival, Federal
- NRHP reference No.: 94000986
- VLR No.: 053-0001

Significant dates
- Added to NRHP: August 25, 1994
- Designated VLR: June 15, 1994

Rose Hill Farm is a home and farm located near Upperville, Loudoun County, Virginia. The original section of the house was built about 1820, and is 2 1/2-story, five-bay, gable roofed brick dwelling in the federal style. The front facade features an elaborate two-story porch with cast-iron decoration in a grapevine pattern that was added possibly in the 1850s. Also on the property are the contributing 1 1/2-story, brick former slave quarters / smokehouse / dairy (c. 1820); one-story, log meat house; frame octagonal icehouse; 3 1/2-story, three-bay, gable-roofed, stone granary (1850s); a 19th-century, arched stone bridge; family cemetery; and 19th-century stone wall.

It was listed on the National Register of Historic Places in 1994.
