= Henry Levy House =

- U.S. Historic district – Contributing property
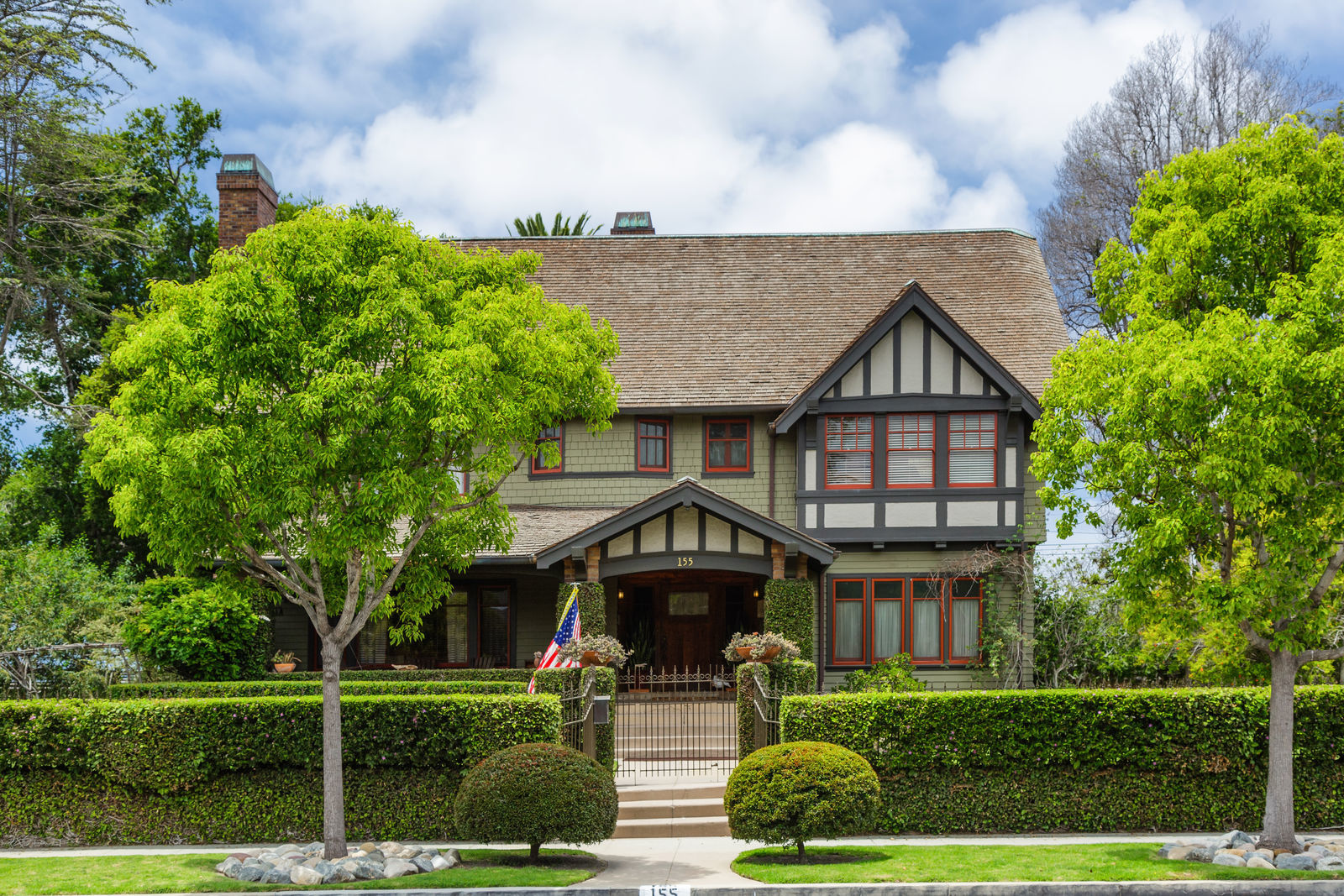

- Location within California
- Location: 155 S. G Street, Oxnard, California, U.S.
- Coordinates: 34.2020°N 119.1869°W
- Built: 1915
- Architect: Homer W. Glidden
- Architectural style: Bungalow/craftsman
- Website: henrylevyhouse.com
- Part of: Henry T. Oxnard Historic District (ID99000109)
- Designated CP: February 5, 1999

The Henry Levy House at 155 S. G Street is a historic American Craftsman home located in Oxnard, California. The house has 18 rooms with five bedrooms and five bathrooms, a detached two-car garage, and a detached workshop in the rear. It is approximately 5,200 square feet (480 m^{2}) and sits on three parcels of land totaling nearly 21,000 square feet (2,000 m^{2}).

== History and historic designation ==
Achille Levy settled in Ventura County California from Mommenheim, Bas-Rhin, France in the early 1870s. His wife's brother, Henry Levy, came from Paris, France, and joined him in business, establishing a brokerage business before the turn of the century and became one of the outstanding grain and bean dealers in Southern California. They became major leaders in the growth of the City of Oxnard and its surrounding territories. The Bank of A. Levy was co-founded by Achille and Henry.

The house, built by Henry Levy, is part of the Henry T. Oxnard Historic District in downtown Oxnard, California, a 70-acre area that was listed on the National Register of Historic Places in 1999. In December 1982, it was listed as No. 74 on the list of Ventura County Historic Landmarks. Levy's brother, Achille Levy, built No. 75 on the list located at 201 S. D Street, just a few blocks away. Eight employees (cashiers, tellers, bookkeepers) of the Bank of A. Levy or of a Henry Levy company also owned houses in the district.

The house is a hybrid of the Craftsman and Tudor styles of architecture. It was designed by Los Angeles architect Homer W. Glidden, who was also known for designing Upland, California's oldest civic building, the Old Carnegie Library in 1913, and the firehouse adjacent to it.

The two fireplaces in the house are adorned with handcrafted tiles by Pasadena tile craftsman, Ernest Batchelder.

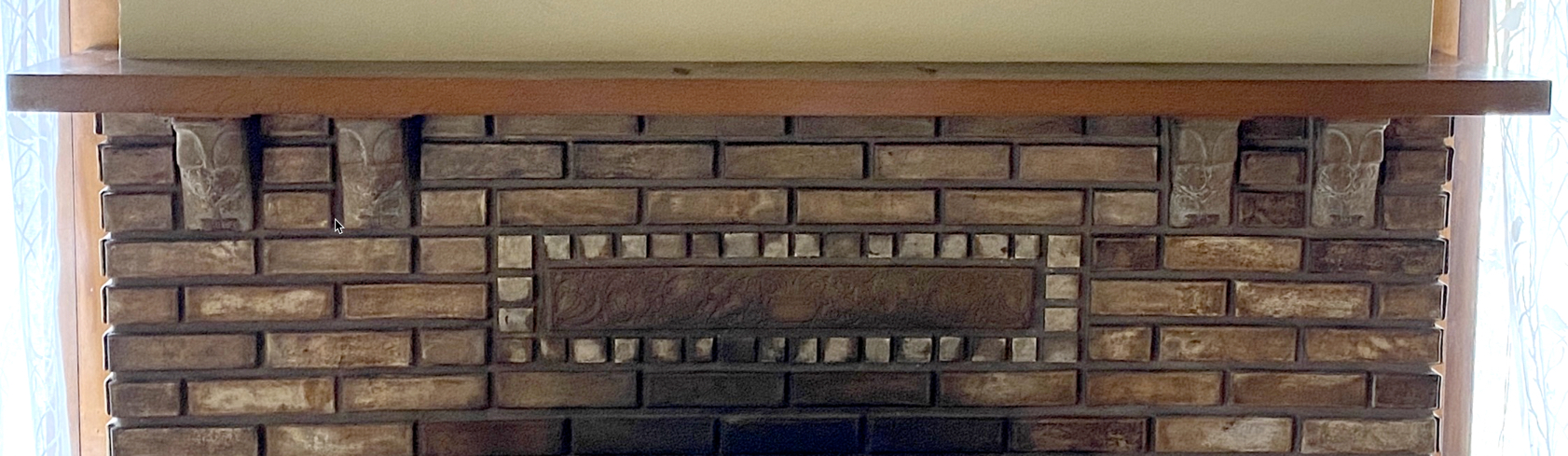

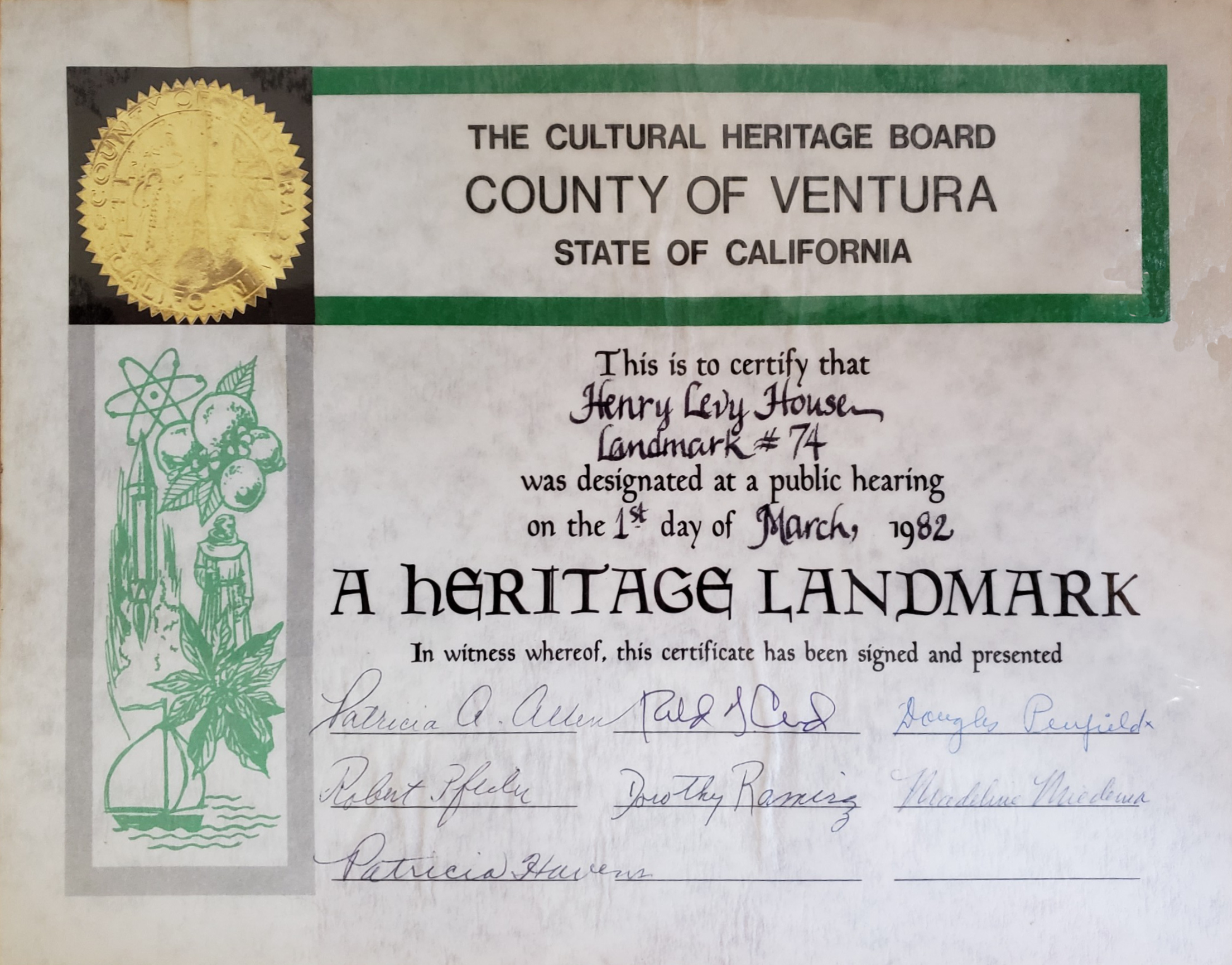
Henry Levy House Heritage Landmark Certificate

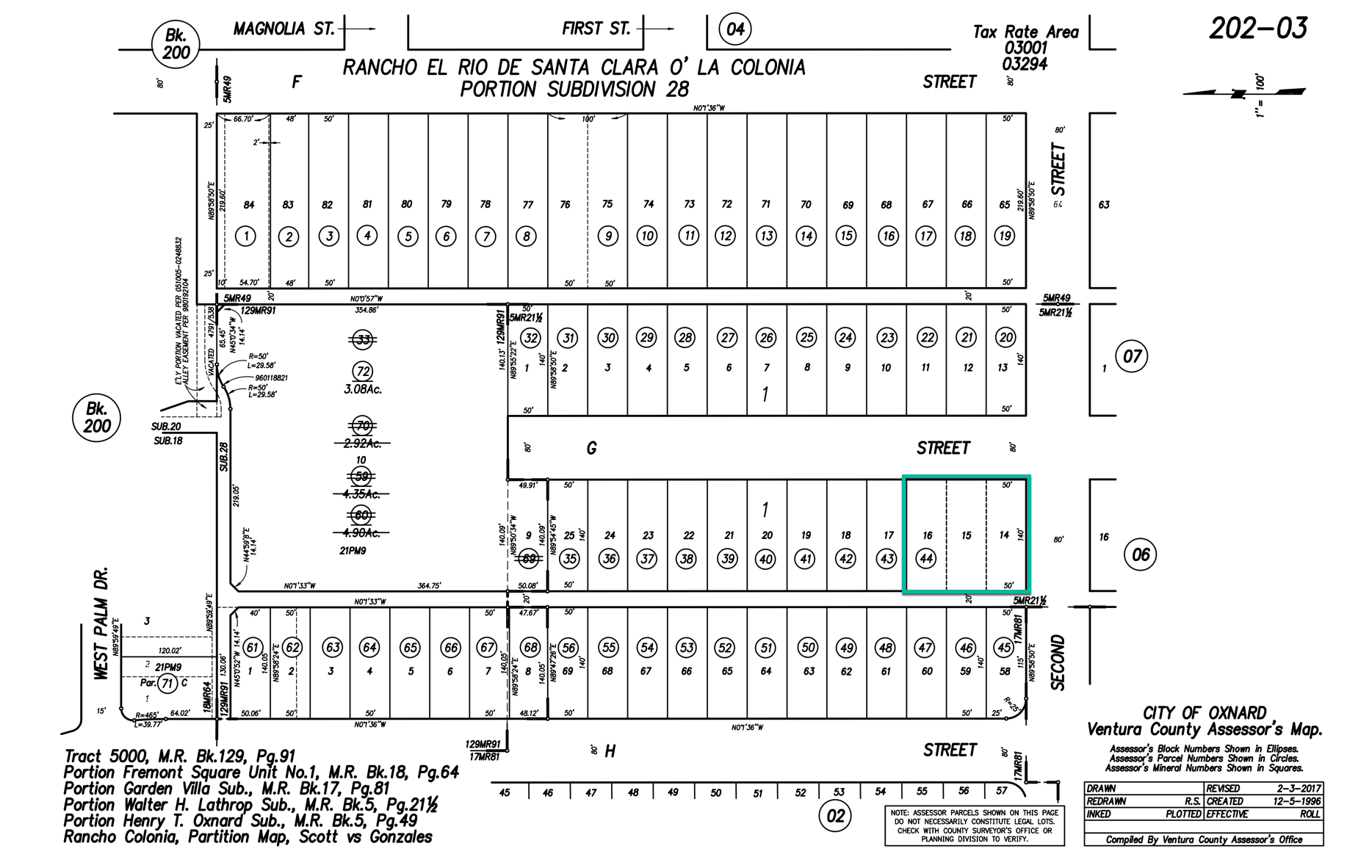

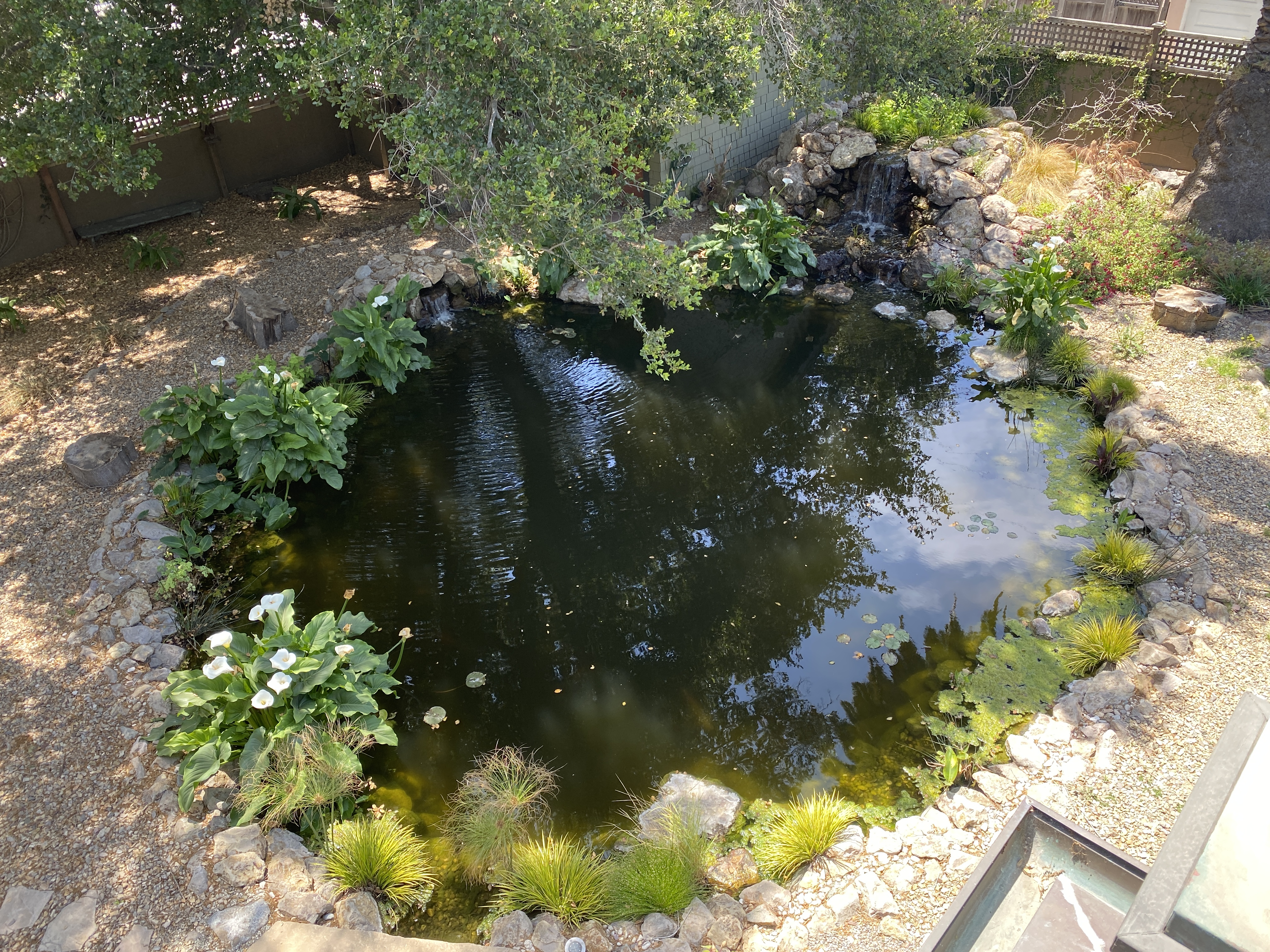
The koi pond at the Henry Levy House in Oxnard, CA

In the 1940s, a large master suite was added onto the second floor. In the early 2000s, the kitchen was remodeled and modernized, and a fence installed around the property. In 2020, a large koi pond was installed in the backyard.

== Film location ==
In 1996, the television show Melrose Place filmed 3 episodes at the house for its 5th season. The house was used as the Bel Air home of Dr. Dan Hathaway played by actor Greg Evigan.

In 1997 the house was used in the made-for-TV movie What We Did That Night, also known as Murder at Devil's Glen, starring Ricky Schroder.

The show was the 23rd season finale episode of "Ghost Adventures" on Thanksgiving night, 2022. Homeowners Eric Andrist and Jeff Rizzo detailed how locked doors were caught flying open on their security cameras and provided a clip to the show of a creepy voice while host Zak Bagans was filming on the second floor. The episode also featured a neighboring house with a family who knew the Levy sisters, depicting them as racist.

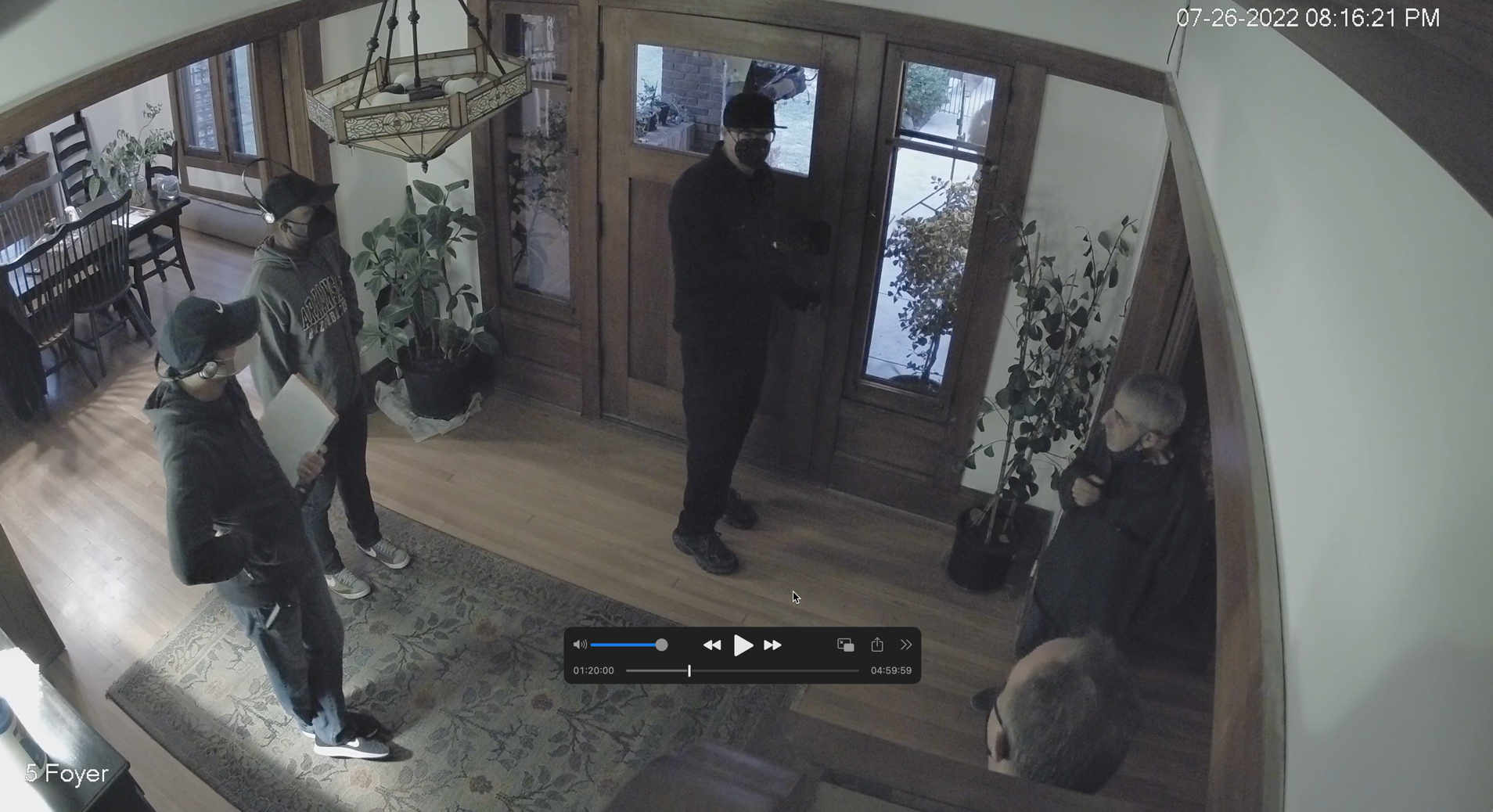
Ghost Adventures filming in the Henry Levy House

== Other ==
In 2017, the house was described in American Bungalow magazine and listed for sale at $1.45 million.
