= Richard Henry Dulany =

Army colonel and horseman

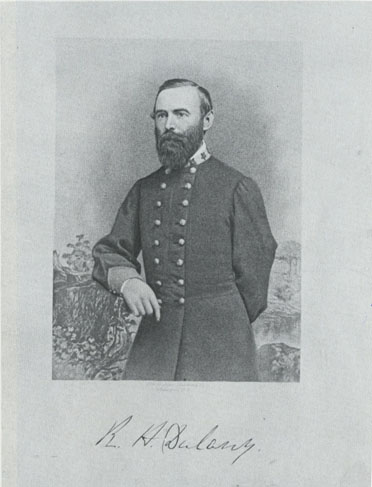
- Military portrait of Colonel Richard Henry Dulany
- Born: August 10, 1820; Loudoun County, Virginia
- Died: October 31, 1906 (aged 86); Upperville, Virginia
- Military career
- Allegiance: United States of America; Confederate States of America
- Branch: Confederate States Army Cavalry
- Service years: 1861–65
- Rank: Colonel
- Unit: 7th Virginia Cavalry
- Conflicts: American Civil War

Colonel Richard Henry Dulany (August 10, 1820 – October 31, 1906) was an American equestrian.

== Early life ==
Richard Henry Dulany was born on August 10, 1820, in Unison, Loudoun County, Virginia. He was the son of John Peyton Dulany and Mary Ann DeButts, and the grandson of Samuel DeButts of Oxon Cove Park and Oxon Hill Farm. The Dulany family descend from the O'Dulanys of County Queen's, Ireland, and reached America when Daniel (the Elder), Joseph, and William Dulany arrived in Port Tobacco, Charles County, British Colonial Maryland, in April, 1703.

== Adult life ==
He Dulany founded the Upperville Colt & Horse Show in 1853. It is the oldest horse show in America. He also founded the Piedmont Fox Hounds in 1840, one of the oldest foxhunting organizations in the country.

During the American Civil War, he was first a captain of Company A, 6th Virginia Cavalry, and then colonel of the 7th Virginia Cavalry. Colonel Dulany was badly wounded at Kernstown. In Rosser's fight with Sheridan his left arm was permanently disabled, and in the capture of the block house at Brock's Gap, his right arm was wounded.

== Personal life ==
He married his cousin Rebecca Anne Dulany and they had five children: Mary, Fanny, Johnnie, Hal and Richard ("Dick"). Richard Dulany resided first at Old Welbourne with his father, but he later moved to present Welbourne, where the descendants, now in the eighth generation, still live today.

== Death ==
He died in Upperville, Virginia in 1906. He was buried at the Old Welbourne Cemetery in Bluemont, Virginia.
