= Upperville Historic District =

Historic district in Virginia, United States

- U.S. National Register of Historic Places
- U.S. Historic district
- Virginia Landmarks Register
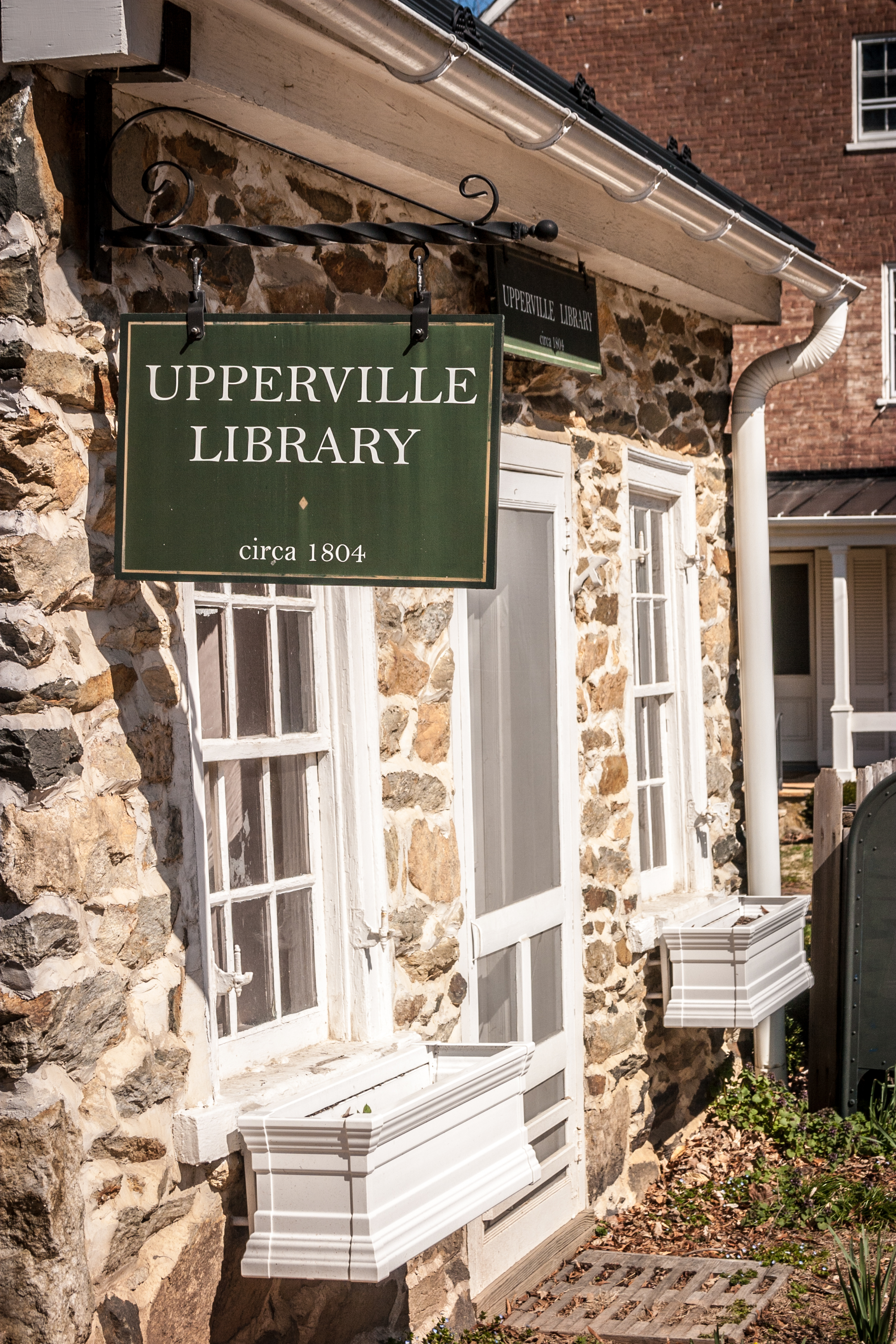
- Upperville Library, Upperville Historic District, April 2013

- Location within Northern Virginia Location within Virginia Location within the United States
- Location: Including the entire village extending approximately 1 mi. along Rt. 50, Upperville, Virginia
- Coordinates: 38°59′31″N 77°52′56″W
- Area: 480 acres (190 ha)
- Architectural style: Greek Revival, Italianate, Federal
- NRHP reference No.: 72001394
- VLR No.: 030-5438

Significant dates
- Added to NRHP: October 18, 1972
- Designated VLR: January 18, 1972

Upperville Historic District is a national historic district located at Upperville, Fauquier County, Virginia. It encompasses 75 contributing buildings in the rural village of Upperville. The district includes residential, commercial, and institutional buildings that mostly date to the first half of the 19th century. Notable buildings include the Joseph Carr houses (1796, 1810), the Doctor Smith House (1830s), the United Methodist Church (1833), the Upperville library (1826), the Upperville Primitive Baptist Church (1840) and the Baptist Church (1889).

It was listed on the National Register of Historic Places in 1972.
