= Green Garden (Upperville, Virginia) =

Historic house in Virginia, United States

- U.S. National Register of Historic Places
- Virginia Landmarks Register
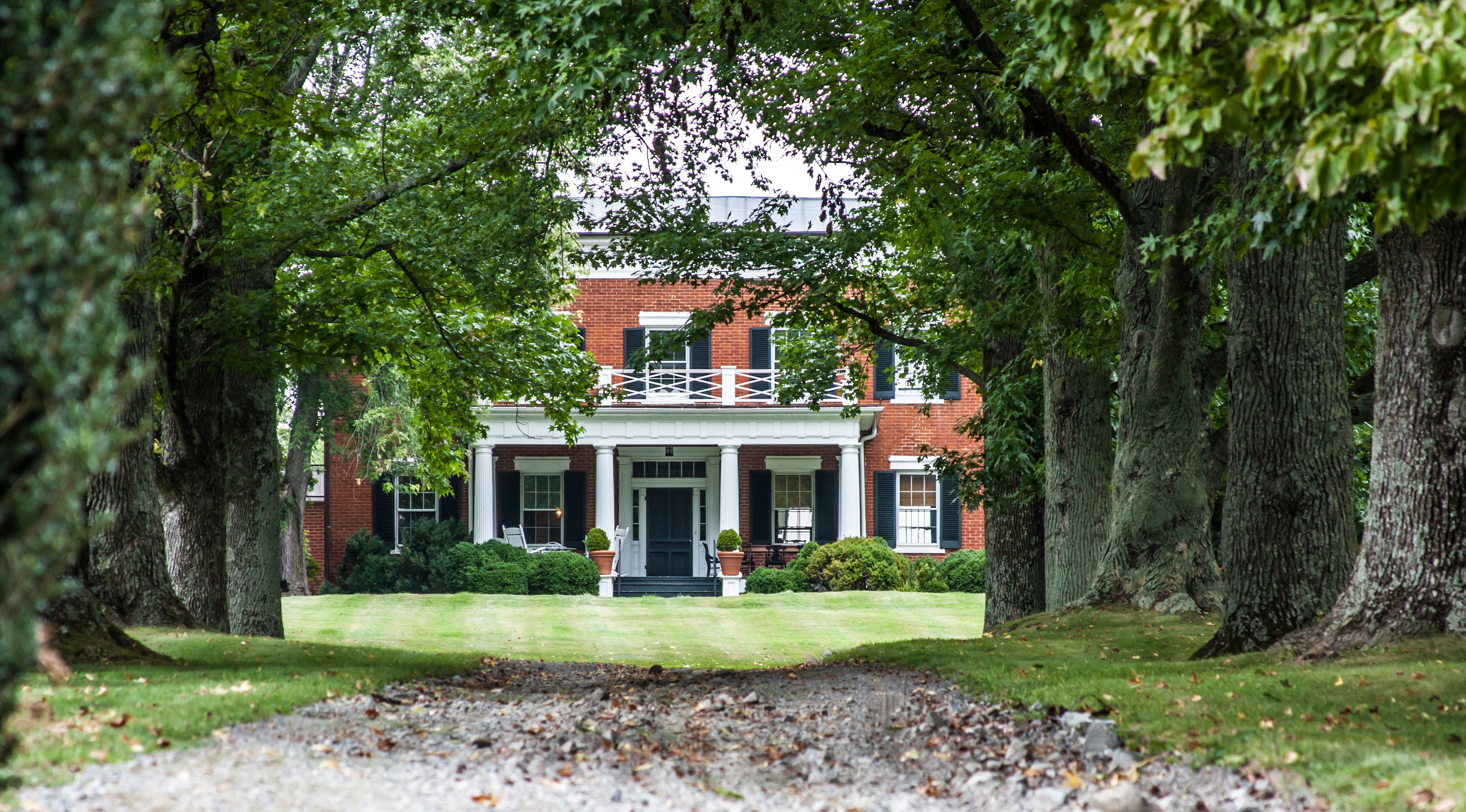
- Green Garden, August 2012

- Location within Northern Virginia Location within Virginia Location within the United States
- Location: 22439 Green Garden Rd., Upperville, Virginia
- Coordinates: 38°59′55″N 77°51′42″W
- Area: 34.3 acres (13.9 ha)
- Built: 1833, c. 1846, c. 1856, 1921
- Architectural style: Early Republic, Mid 19th Century Revival
- NRHP reference No.: 07000769
- VLR No.: 053-0509

Significant dates
- Added to NRHP: July 24, 2007
- Designated VLR: June 6, 2007

Green Garden is a historic home and farm located near Upperville, Loudoun County, Virginia. The house was built in four phases. The original section of the house was built about 1833, and is a portion of the rear ell. The main block was built about 1846, and is a two-story, five-bay, single pile brick structure in the Greek Revival style. A two-story rear ell was added about 1856, and it was connected to original 1833 section with an extension in 1921. The front facade features a three-bay porch with full Doric order entablature. Also on the property are the contributing root cellar (c. 1833), a smokehouse (c. 1847), a barn (c. 1870), a garage/office building (c. 1950), and ice house.

It was listed on the National Register of Historic Places in 2007.
