= Upperville Colt & Horse Show =

The Upperville Colt & Horse Show is the oldest horse show in America. Started in 1853 by Colonel Richard Henry Dulany, the show was designed to showcase and improve local breeding stock in Northern Virginia. Colonel Dulany continued to run the show until his death in 1906. The show has occupied the same scenic spot since its inception 172 years ago; under the shady oak trees of Grafton Farm, near Upperville, Virginia.

== History ==
According to historians, Colonel Dulany was riding cross-country one cold winter's day and came across a young colt who was cast in a low fence. Stopping to free the young horse, he realized the colt had been stuck long enough for his feet to have frozen. Reflecting on the fate of the young horse, Colonel Dulany decided to start a colt & filly show to encourage better care of young horses, and to inspire local breeders to breed better stock.

The show was scheduled for June under the oak trees at Grafton Farm, a centrally located Dulany farm on route 50, two miles east of Upperville. The first show listed two classes, one for colts, and one for fillies. Prior to the first show, Colonel Dulany went to Manhattan to consult with silversmith Louis Tiffany to design a suitable trophy, the labor on which was donated by Mr. Tiffany for the event. The first show proved so popular, a club was formed to run the show. The club, originally called the Upperville Union Club, elected Colonel Dulany as its first president.

No event was held in 1861–65, 1917–18, 1942–45 nor 2020.

== The Show today ==
The AA rated show, considered one of the most prestigious in the country, now spans seven days and showcases over two thousand horse and rider combinations. It was named the "Horse Show of the Year" by the National Show Hunter Hall of Fame and the Virginia Horse Show Association. The prize list includes classes in breeding, hunters, and jumpers, and entries range from local children to leading Olympic and Show Jumping World Cup horses and riders.

The show attracts over 20,000 spectators, is a designated World Champion Hunter Rider show, and finishes with the popular $208,000 FEI 4* Grand Prix, presented by St. Brides Farm, on the final Sunday.
