= Upperville, Virginia =

Unincorporated community in Virginia, United States

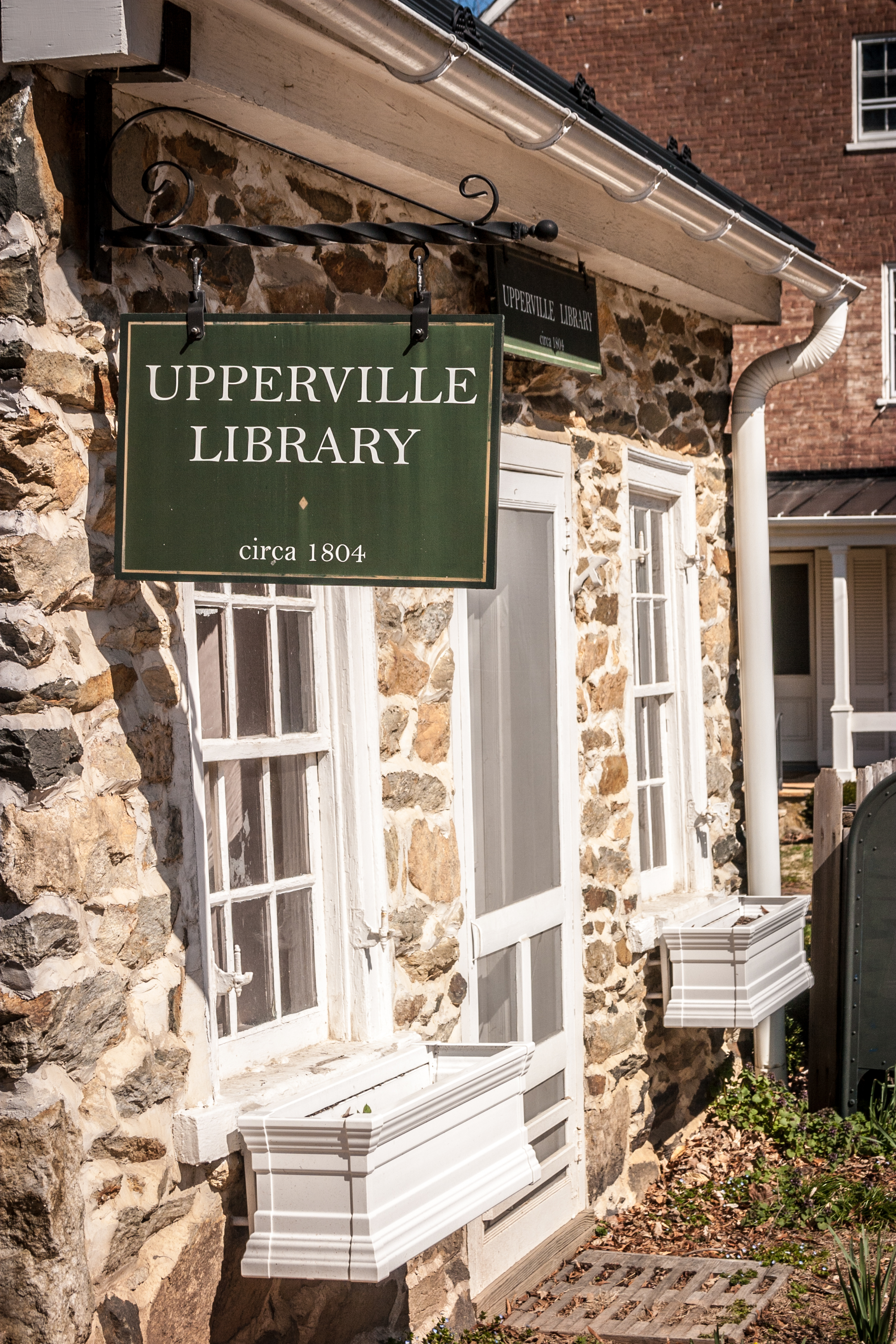

- Location within Northern Virginia Location within Virginia Location within the United States
- Coordinates: 38°59′38″N 77°53′05″W
- Country: United States
- State: Virginia
- County: Fauquier, Loudoun
- Time zone: UTC−5 (Eastern (EST))
  - Summer (DST): UTC−4 (EDT)

Upperville is an unincorporated census-designated place (CDP) in Fauquier and Loudoun Counties in Virginia, United States, along U.S. Route 50, fifty miles from downtown Washington, D.C.. Founded in the 1790s along Pantherskin Creek, it was originally named Carrstown by first settler Josephus Carr. Through an 1819 act passed by the Virginia General Assembly, the name was changed to Upperville.

John Updike wrote of Upperville in his sardonic 1961 poem "Upon Learning That a Town Exists Called Upperville".

== History ==
Upperville has been designated as the Upperville Historic District and is a Virginia Historic Landmark that is listed in the National Register of Historic Places. Also listed are Blue Ridge Farm, Greengarden Farm, Oakley, and Rose Hill Farm.

Situated eight miles to the west of Middleburg and part of Virginia's famous Piedmont horse country, the Upperville/Middleburg area is home to a number of prominent Thoroughbred horse breeding farms and country estates. The Upperville Colt & Horse Show, conceived by Colonel Richard Henry Dulany and first held in 1853, remains the oldest such event in America. A Dulany family member owned Oakley Farm. It was the site of two battles during the American Civil War. Near Upperville, Californian Henry T. Oxnard built a horse breeding operation in 1903 that he named Blue Ridge Farm. It was bought by Rear Admiral Cary Travers Grayson in 1928, and members of the Grayson family still own the property, which is listed in the National Register of Historic Places.

Over the years, others who came to live in the area included heiress Isabel Dodge Sloane, who built the highly successful Brookmeade Stable, Llangollen estate, where Liz Whitney Tippett lived for nearly six decades, Bertram and Diana Firestone's Newstead Farm, Sandy Lerner's Ayrshire Farm and the very prestigious Rokeby Farm of Paul Mellon. It was Mellon who, in the 1950s, donated the money to build Trinity Episcopal Church, which is at the center of the small community's social activities. For two days each year more than ten horse farms and centers in Upperville and Middleburg open their gates to visitors. Since 1960, the Hunt Country Stable Tour has raised money for the outreach programs of Trinity Episcopal Church.

== Demographics ==
Upperville first appeared as a census designated place in the 2020 U.S. census.

== Notable people ==
- Sandy Lerner, co-founder of Cisco Systems, lives in Upperville, owning and operating a farm there.
- Jill Holtzman Vogel, Virginia State Senator who with her husband owns a mansion in Upperville.
- Rachel "Bunny" (née Lambert) Mellon, horticulturist who designed the White House Rose Garden and established a botanical library at Oak Spring Farms.

== See also ==
- Battle of Upperville
- The Community Music School of the Piedmont
