= Hueneme =

Hueneme may refer to:

- Port Hueneme, California, coastal city in Ventura County
- Port of Hueneme, deep-water harbor
