= Fred T. Perris =

Railway engineer

Fred Thomas Perris (January 2, 1837 – May 12, 1916) was Chief Engineer of the Atchison, Topeka, and Santa Fe Railway, who oversaw the construction of the last leg of the 2nd Transcontinental Railroad from Barstow, California through Cajon Pass and down to San Bernardino and Los Angeles, a task that employed six thousand laborers and is still in use by BNSF Railway and Union Pacific Railroad He also laid track from Riverside, California to San Diego, California, laying out a series to town sites along the track, one of which, Perris, California was named in his honor. The city of Perris, California, a station on the California Southern Railroad, was named in his honor.

== Youth and education ==
Frederick Thomas Perris was born in Gloucester, England, on January 2, 1837. At age 12 his parents emigrated to Australia where he was apprenticed to an architect/mechanic. At age 16 he moved again with his mother and sisters, settling in the Mormon colony at San Bernardino, California, where he was employed as the chain boy on the crew that surveyed and subdivided that city.

Four years later, when the colony collapsed the family moved to Utah, where they learned his father, rather than join the Mormons, had sold his assets in Australia, returned to England and died. He proceeded to England to settle his father's estate. During the two years that required, he was employed as an apprentice in the new technology of photography. Returning to America with his 'childhood sweetheart' as his bride, he proceeded to Salt Lake City, Utah, where he attempted, apparently without much success, to sell his wares as a photographer.

== Career ==
=== Utah ===
In 1863, at age 26, he was hired to survey and subdivide land for a city named Perris, Idaho (later renamed Paris). That landed him a position surveying a route for the transcontinental railroad across Utah; but he lost his job in a labor dispute with Brigham Young. He worked for a number of years as a haberdasher, and involved himself in radical politics. He was one of the founders of the Liberal Party of Utah, running for a seat on the city council. Although the party was defeated 20 to 1 in the election, it was a milestone in that it was the first multi-party election in territorial history.

Perris was one of the founders of the Salt Lake Tribune, originally designed to be the voice of the party; but which has since evolved into the largest newspaper in the state. For two years in its infancy he ran the paper. His was the only name on the masthead during a time when resentment was high against a dissenting opinion against the dominant religion. Then in 1874 he abruptly resigned, sold the paper to a half dozen outsiders, and moved to San Bernardino where he spent the remaining forty years of his life.

=== Southern California ===
==== Surveyor ====
In the first year he attempted to establish a newspaper in Southern California; but then was offered the job as the San Bernardino County Surveyor. In that capacity he surveyed the largest county (in terms of land area) of the United States, which included much of the Mojave Desert, part of Death Valley, and all the San Bernardino Mountains. He laid out sites for reservoirs and laid the foundations for the water system that now supplies the Inland Empire.

==== Railroads ====
When railroads came to the area he first went to work as Chief Engineer of the California Southern Railroad, a company chartered to build a rail line between San Diego on the coast and Barstow in the desert. When it was taken over in a merger, he advanced to Chief Engineer of the Atchison, Topeka and Santa Fe Railway. In 1885 he oversaw the construction of the railroad through the difficult Cajon Pass, between the San Gabriel Mountains and San Bernardino Mountains east to the Mojave Desert. It is a route that is still in use by BNSF Railway and Union Pacific Railroad, and the pass by the Interstate 15 highway. Perris held the Chief Engineer position with Santa Fe for 35 years.

Perris was married to Marrinetta E. Perris, and they had a son named Walter. The 1910 census lists their residence in San Bernardino, California. Perris died in 1916.

(Chard Walkers "Cajon. Rail Passage To The Pacific.")

== Legacy ==
- Two cities in the United States are named in his honor, Perris, California, and Paris, Idaho.
- Orange Empire Railway Museum – Perris, California
- Perris Valley Historical and Museum Association – Fred T. Perris archives
