= Martin V. Smith =

American restaurateur

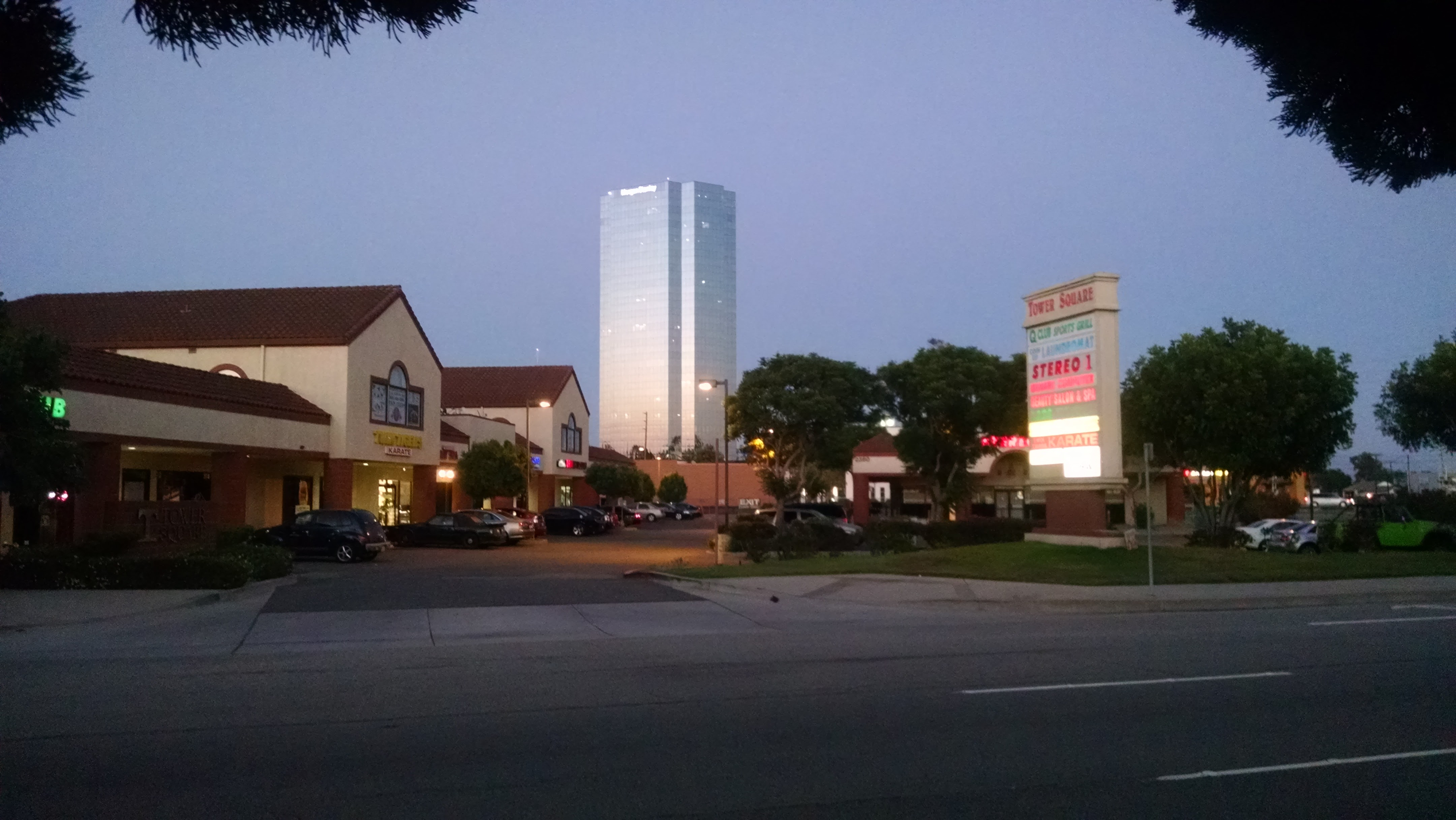
Oxnard Financial Plaza was developed by Martin V. Smith & Associates.

Martin V. Smith, also known as Bud Smith (October 18, 1916 – November 18, 2001) was an Oxnard, California developer and philanthropist with properties from Los Angeles County to San Luis Obispo County. He was born in Sioux Falls, South Dakota. In 1941, he ventured into business when he traded a collection of jukeboxes for a failing hamburger drive-in on Oxnard Boulevard that he remodeled into the Colonial House Restaurant; he was 23 years old. After returning from military service in the South Pacific during World War II, Smith transformed the Colonial House into the most popular restaurant in Ventura County. The Colonial House was frequented by Hollywood stars. The Colonial House was demolished in 1988: its stone fireplace remained standing for many years alongside Oxnard Boulevard until the parcel was developed.

His first venture into development came in 1945 when he purchased 40 acres (160,000 m^{2}) of flood-prone land at the junction of U.S. Route 101 and Pacific Coast Highway, and began construction on The Wagon Wheel Junction, a collection of offices, shops, restaurants and a motel. The Wagon Wheel Motel was completed in 1947, and quickly became a popular stop for travelers between Los Angeles and Santa Barbara. The Trade Winds restaurant was built in 1964, designed by Fred Moninger of 20th Century Fox and decorator Ione Keenan, had a lagoon with a Chinese junk. Don Ho and the Beach Boys performed there. They would bring guests by rickshaw from the Wagon Wheel Motel and the interior was decorated with Bud's collection from his world travels.

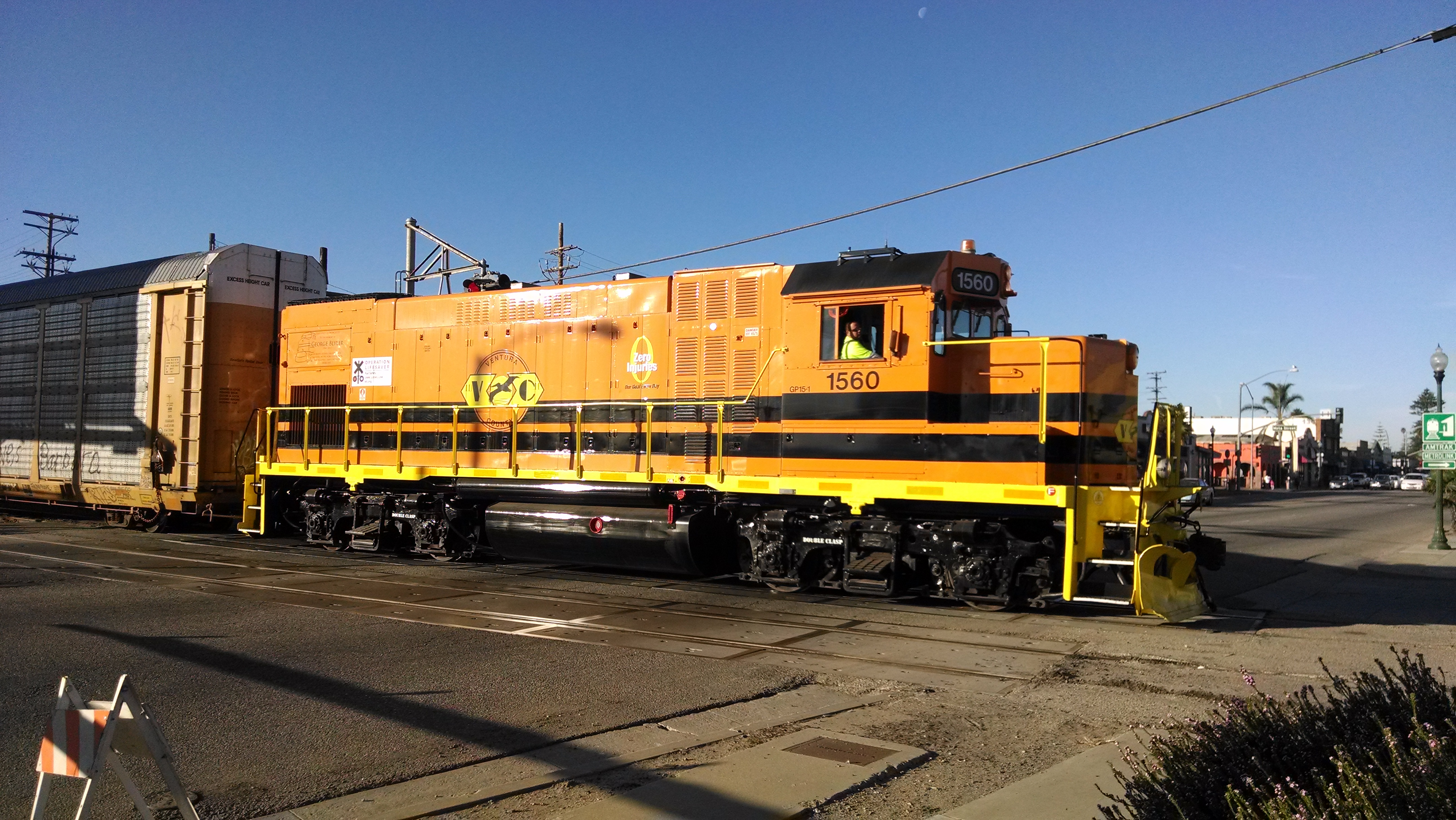
Smith owned the Ventura County Railway for a time.

The shortline railroad, Ventura County Railway, that links the coastal line, constructed by Southern Pacific, with the Port of Hueneme was acquired in 1958. Nearby he built along Peninsula Road in the midst of Channel Islands Harbor including the Casa Sirena Resort, Villa Sirena Apartments and the Lobster Trap Restaurant. With his boat, the Dry Martini, docked nearby, he lived in one of the complexes.

Smith went on to develop a number of restaurants, motels, shopping centers, and finally the high-rise Financial Plaza Towers in Oxnard, the tallest buildings between Los Angeles and San Jose. When Bud Smith began his retirement in the mid-1990s, his company, Martin V. Smith and Associates was the biggest developer and landlord in Oxnard with some 4500 tenants and over 200 properties from Calabasas to Santa Maria.

Smith was a philanthropist who donated millions of dollars to various causes and organizations. He and his wife, Martha, created the Martin V. and Martha K. Smith Foundation to support community organizations. He financed the construction of a new Boys and Girls Club in Oxnard, which was named after him. He also donated 8 million dollars to finance the construction of California State University, Channel Islands, and the first school on its campus was named after him, the Martin V. Smith School of Business and Economics, as well as the Martin V. Smith Professorship in Land Use Studies, and the Martin V. Smith Center for Integrative Decision Making.

Smith died at home in Oxnard, on November 18, 2001, at the age of 85, surrounded by family and friends. He had been diagnosed with Parkinson's disease several years earlier and died of complications.
