= San Buenaventura Conservancy =

The San Buenaventura Conservancy for Preservation is an historic preservation organization in Ventura, California also known by its early name of San Buenaventura. It works to recognize and revitalize historic, archeological and cultural resources in the region. The Conservancy is a non-profit 501c3 organization. The group was formed in 2004 after the demolition of the Mayfair Theater, an S. Charles Lee, Streamline Moderne, movie theater in downtown Ventura, California that was razed and replaced with a condominium project.

== Mission ==
The San Buenaventura Conservancy mission statement: "To work through advocacy and outreach to recognize preserve and revitalize the irreplaceable historic, architectural and cultural resources of San Buenaventura and surrounding areas. To seek to increase public awareness of and participation in local preservation issues, and disseminate information useful in the preservation of structures and neighborhoods of San Buenaventura." San Buenaventura Conservancy website

== Programs & Projects ==
The organization produces annual historic architecture tours in the historic neighborhoods and districts in midtown, downtown and the west side of Ventura, California. The conservancy is an all-volunteer organization with a ten-member board. Some of the Conservancy's most successful projects outside of the Ventura architectural Weekend tours and trade shows has been the ability of the board to work closely the City of Ventura, California and developers to find preservation solutions for historic buildings. At times the Conservancy advocates for specific historic buildings like Willett Ranch link to article and the Top Hat Burger Palace in Ventura, the Frank Petit House in South Oxnard, California, the Charles McCoy house, in Port Hueneme, California, and the Bracero farm Worker Camp in Piru, California, and the Wagon Wheel Motel on the 101 Freeway in Oxnard, California. Additionally the Conservancy works to strengthen preservation policies of local municipalities. It has achieved success at integrating appropriate preservation actions and policies into Ventura's General Plan, Downtown Specific Plan, and Westside Community Plan.

On March 2, 2009 the San Buenaventura Conservancy – with attorney Susan Brandt-Hawley – filed suit in Ventura County Superior Court against the City of Oxnard, California, claiming that the City’s approval of the Oxnard Village Specific Plan project violated the California Environmental Quality Act (CEQA). link to article The project, as approved, requires the demolition of the Wagon Wheel Motel and restaurant, El Ranchito and bowling alley along with everything built on the 64-acre (260,000 m^{2}) site. The Conservancy case argues that the project can be feasibly accomplished without demolition of the Wagon Wheel, and CEQA therefore does not allow the Class 1 impact. The lawsuit requests issuance of a peremptory writ ordering the City to set aside its approval of the project pending compliance with CEQA.

The original Ventura County Superior Court case was presented July 10, 2009. The Judge sided with the city of Oxnard. The San Buenaventura Conservancy has appealed the ruling and received a stay of demolition until the outcome of the appeal case: San Buenaventura Conservancy v. City of Oxnard et al. (CEQA) (Case: B220512 2nd District, Division 6.) link to article On Wednesday December 15, a three judge panel at the California 2nd district Court of Appeal in Ventura, California heard arguments from attorneys representing the case: Susan Brandt-Hawley for the San Buenaventura Conservancy, and Rachel Cook representing the developer ( Oxnard Village Investments, LLC.) and the city of Oxnard, California. The Appeals Court sided with the City of Oxnard on March 17, 2011 and agreed with the Superior court that the CEQA review was sufficient. The Wagon Wheel was demolished a week later.
