= VCY =

VCY may refer to:

- The variable-charge Y-linked gene, whose HGNC ID is 12668
- VCY America
- The reporting mark for the Ventura County Railway
