= Wagon wheel =

Wagon wheel may refer to:

== Transport ==
- The wheel of a wagon

== Business ==
- Wagon Wheels, a brand of biscuits in the United Kingdom, Canada, and Australia
- Wagon Wheel, Oxnard, California, a motel and restaurant (now demolished) on U.S. Route 101
- Wagon Wheel Motel, Café and Station on U.S. Route 66 in Cuba, Missouri

== Music ==
- "Wagon Wheel" (song), written by Bob Dylan and Ketch Secor and recorded by Old Crow Medicine Show, Darius Rucker and Nathan Carter
- "Wagon Wheel", a song on Lou Reed's 1972 album Transformer
- "Wagon Wheels" (song), a classic American Western song circa 1930
- Wagon Wheel (album), an album by Nathan Carter

== Places ==
- Wagon Wheel, Arizona, an unincorporated community
- Wagon Wheel, New Mexico, an unincorporated community
- Wagon Wheel, Oxnard, California, a neighborhood in the city of Oxnard, California

== Other uses ==
- Wagon Wheel (trophy), a trophy awarded to the winner of a football game between the University of Akron and Kent State University
- Wagon-wheel effect, the perception of a spinning object under a strobe light or on film
- Wagon wheel, a chart used in cricket showing where a batsman hit the ball
- Wagon wheel, an alternate name for the Rotelle pasta
- The Wagon Wheel Theatre, a venue in Warsaw, Indiana
- Wagon Wheels (film), a 1934 Western starring Randolph Scott

== See also ==
- Wagon Heels, a 1945 Merrie Melodies cartoon
