= Perris Valley Historical and Museum Association =

The Perris Valley Historical and Museum Association (PVH&MA) was founded in 1964 to gather, protect, and preserve the history of the Perris Valley.

The association collects, catalogues, and displays items of historical interest, in addition to publishing pamphlets on valley history. Collections include artifacts from the Luiseño people, turn-of-the-century clothing, farming equipment, mining tools, and personal effects from the city's namesake, Fred T. Perris.

The Perris Santa Fe Depot normally houses the museum, but many of the collections are now in storage until the renovation of the historic Depot is completed. It is built of red brick, a classic example of High Victorian architectural style, recognized by the Native Daughters of the Golden West, and listed on the National Register of Historic Places.

The PVH&MA hosts Fred T. Perris Day and a silent auction annually and participates yearly in the Potato Festival, Christmas Parade, and Southern California Fair. The current president of the Association is Midgie Parker.

== See also ==
- Southern California Railway Museum
- Pinacate Mining District
- Southern Hotel (Perris, California)
- Railroad Canyon
