= Ventura County Railroad =

US Railway company

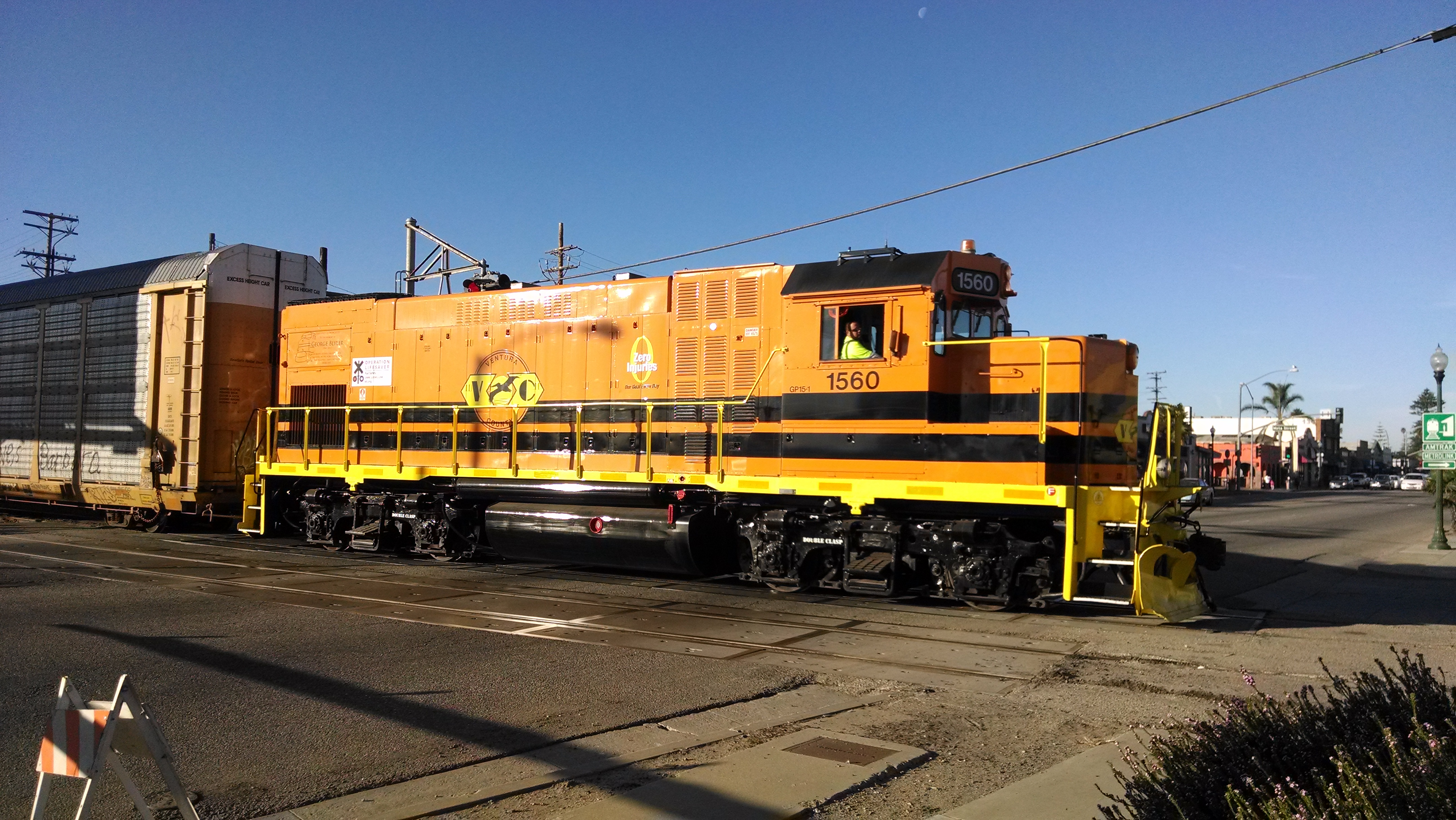

Overview
- Headquarters: Port Hueneme, California
- Reporting mark: VCRR
- Locale: Oxnard, California
- Dates of operation: 1998–

Technical
- Track gauge: 4 ft 8 1/2 in (1,435 mm) standard gauge
- Length: 12 miles (19 km)

Other
- Website: Ventura County Railroad (VCRR)

The Ventura County Railroad (reporting mark VCRR) is a class III railroad subsidiary of Genesee & Wyoming, connecting the Union Pacific Railroad in Oxnard to South Oxnard and Port Hueneme. It began operations in 1998 under RailAmerica, leasing its lines from the Ventura County Railway (reporting mark VCY), owner of lines first opened in about 1905 that have remained independent of larger carriers. The railroad serves industrial areas including the Port of Hueneme and Naval Facilities Expeditionary Logistics Center at Naval Base Ventura County.

== Origin ==
Before Los Angeles port facilities were developed, Port Hueneme seemed a viable competitor; and VCRR's earliest predecessor, the Bakersfield and Ventura Railway, was incorporated in February 1903 to build a railroad from Port Hueneme to Bakersfield via Santa Paula and Piru Canyon. Construction began in 1907 with a 5.5-mile (8.9 km) main line from Port Hueneme up C Street in Oxnard, plus a 3.5-mile (5.6 km) westerly branch to Patterson Ranch and a 7.5-mile (12.1 km) easterly branch to DeBo, Petit, and Round Mountain (now on the campus of California State University Channel Islands). It was reorganized as the Bakersfield and Ventura Railroad in June 1908 with the Oxnard line moved to A street. A railway turntable was constructed at the intersection of First and A Streets in Oxnard where gas motor cars were turned on their six to eight daily round trips until passenger service was abandoned in January 1927.

== Passenger service ==
Number	Builder	Type	Date	Passengers	Notes
001		Inspection car	1907	10 or 12	2-cylinder Fairbanks-Morse engine
002		4-wheel passenger motor	1908	30	open sides with six cross bench seats
003	Hall-Scott	2-truck enclosed car with passenger and baggage sections	1913		150-horsepower (110 kW) 6-cylinder engine

The company also owned two coach trailers. Car number 003 was used as a standby switching locomotive after passenger service was abandoned.

== Steam era ==
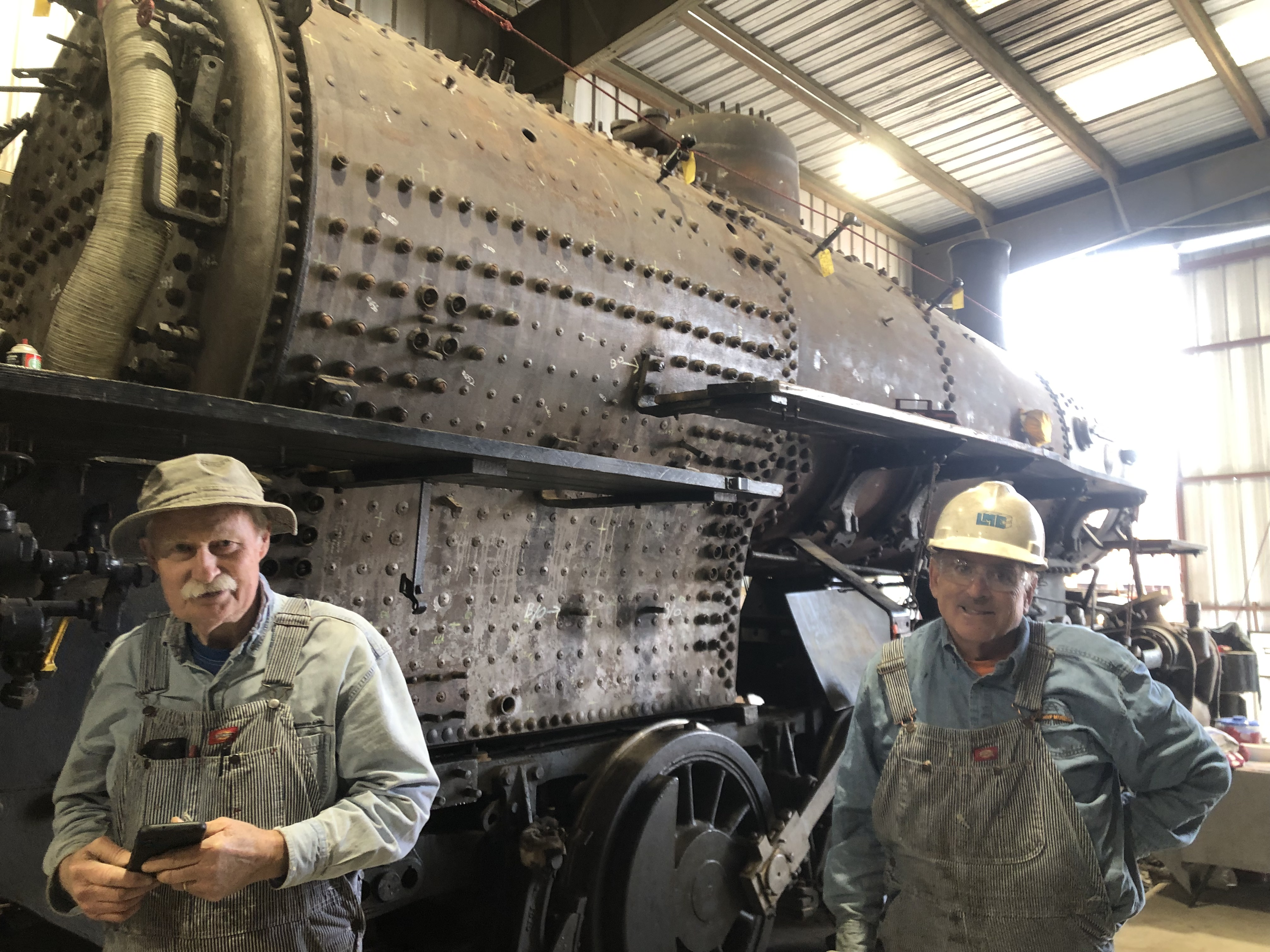
Volunteers Brian Smith and Gary Frueholz at work on the Ventura County RR #2, which is currently undergoing its 1,472-service-day (15 year) inspection at the Southern California Railway Museum, after which it will be returned to operation there.

The property was again sold in June 1911 to the Ventura County Railway, which had been incorporated in May in the interests of the American Beet Sugar Company (renamed American Crystal Sugar Company in 1934), which owned a beet sugar factory at Oxnard. The railroad brought carloads of beets to the factory from surrounding farms; and Port Hueneme packing houses provided 1200 carloads of lemons, 200 carloads of beans, and 75 carloads of box boards annually. World War II development of the Ventura County naval base enabled the line to avoid abandonment as trucks took over shipment of agricultural commodities.

=== Locomotives ===
Number	Builder	Type	Date	Works number	Notes
1st #1	Taunton Locomotive Manufacturing Company	4-6-0	1882	865	purchased from San Pedro, Los Angeles and Salt Lake Railroad #56 in 1905 and used for construction until scrapped in 1906
2nd #1	Baldwin Locomotive Works	2-6-0	1/1906	27285	purchased new, scrapped by 1948.
2	Baldwin Locomotive Works	2-6-2	1922	55415	ex-Cascade Timber Company #107 purchased in 1943, Sold in 1962 to W. E. Standish. Sold to T. Durkin in 1968. Finally sold to the Southern California Railway Museum in 1972. Currently under overhaul.
3	America Locomotive Company	2-6-2	5/1924	65276	ex-Lamm Lumber Company #4 purchased in 1944, scrapped in 1950.

== Diesel era ==
Martin V. Smith purchased the line in 1958. The Ventura County Railroad, organized by RailAmerica to lease the line, began operations in September 1998. The Oxnard Harbor District acquired the Ventura County Railway Company LLC in 2003 with Ventura County Railroad continuing to operate the line.

=== Traffic ===
The railroad's main commodities are new automobiles, petroleum products and wood products. The VCRR hauls approximately 2,000 carloads annually. They ship frozen strawberries and paper products and handle navy equipment.

=== Motive Power ===
- One EMD GP15-1
- One EMD GP7DE (rebuilt from an EMD GP7U)
- One EMD GP38-2
