= Southern California Railway Museum =

- Former name: Orange Empire Railway Museum
- Established: 1956
- Location: 2201 S. "A" St. Perris, California
- Coordinates: 33.7611°N 117.2331°W
- Type: Railroad museum
- Collections: Electric trains & trolleys, steam & diesel locomotives, passenger & freight cars, light rail vehicles, maintenance of way equipment
- Website: www.socalrailway.org

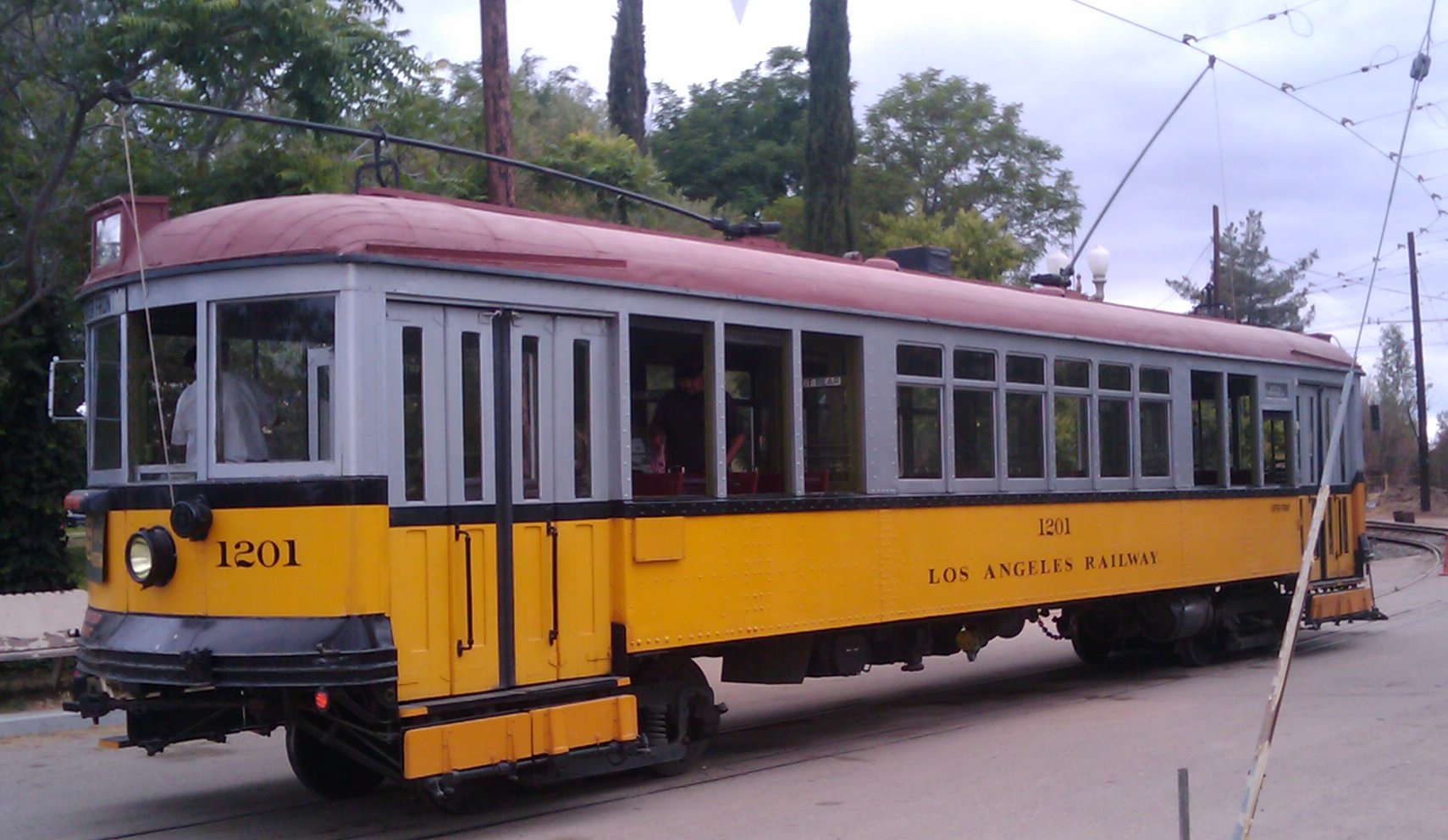
Los Angeles Railway car 1201 operating at Orange Empire Railway Museum in 2009

The Southern California Railway Museum (SCRM, reporting mark OERX), formerly known as the Orange Empire Railway Museum, is a railroad museum in Perris, California, United States. It was founded in 1956 at Griffith Park in Los Angeles before moving to the former Pinacate Station as the "Orange Empire Trolley Museum" in 1958. It was renamed "Orange Empire Railway Museum" in 1975 after merging with a museum then known as the California Southern Railroad Museum, and adopted its current name in 2019. The museum also operates a heritage railroad on the museum grounds and on a right of way into downtown Perris.

== Background ==
The collection focuses on Southern California's railroad history. It houses the largest collection of Pacific Electric Railway rolling stock in the world, much of it rescued from scrapyards after the discontinuation of their passenger operations in 1961.

Two early Los Angeles 3 ft 6 in (1,067 mm) narrow gauge streetcars from the Los Angeles Railway or standard gauge streetcars from the Pacific Electric Railway run each weekend on the one-half-mile (0.8 km)-long, dual gauge (1,435 mm (4 ft 8 1/2 in) and 3 ft 6 in (1,067 mm) narrow gauge) Loop Line. Passenger trains operate on the 1.5-mile (2.4 km)-long, standard gauge mainline that was once a part of the California Southern Railroad, which connected with the Atchison, Topeka and Santa Fe Railway at Barstow, California, forming the first route to a California seaport (San Diego) by a railroad other than the Central Pacific Railroad/Southern Pacific Railroad. Its main line stretches from south of the museum northward towards the junction with BNSF Railway, where the historic Perris Depot on State Route 74 stands. The BNSF Railway spur is in active use, but the museum track onto the spur is currently severed due to Metrolink service, meaning that no museum trains can access the Perris Depot, though has recently been rebuilt. A Pacific Electric interurban "Red Car" also operates on the mainline on selected weekends, but the line electrification ends a block south of the depot. Streetcars and locomotives are selected on a rotating basis. The museum maintains a steam locomotive in operating condition and its use is scheduled for each third weekend, September through May, certain special events and major holidays.

Tours of the grounds, static exhibits and shops can be self-guided or with a docent. A picnic area is located near the main entrance as is an interactive railroad "signal garden."

== Grizzly Flats collection ==
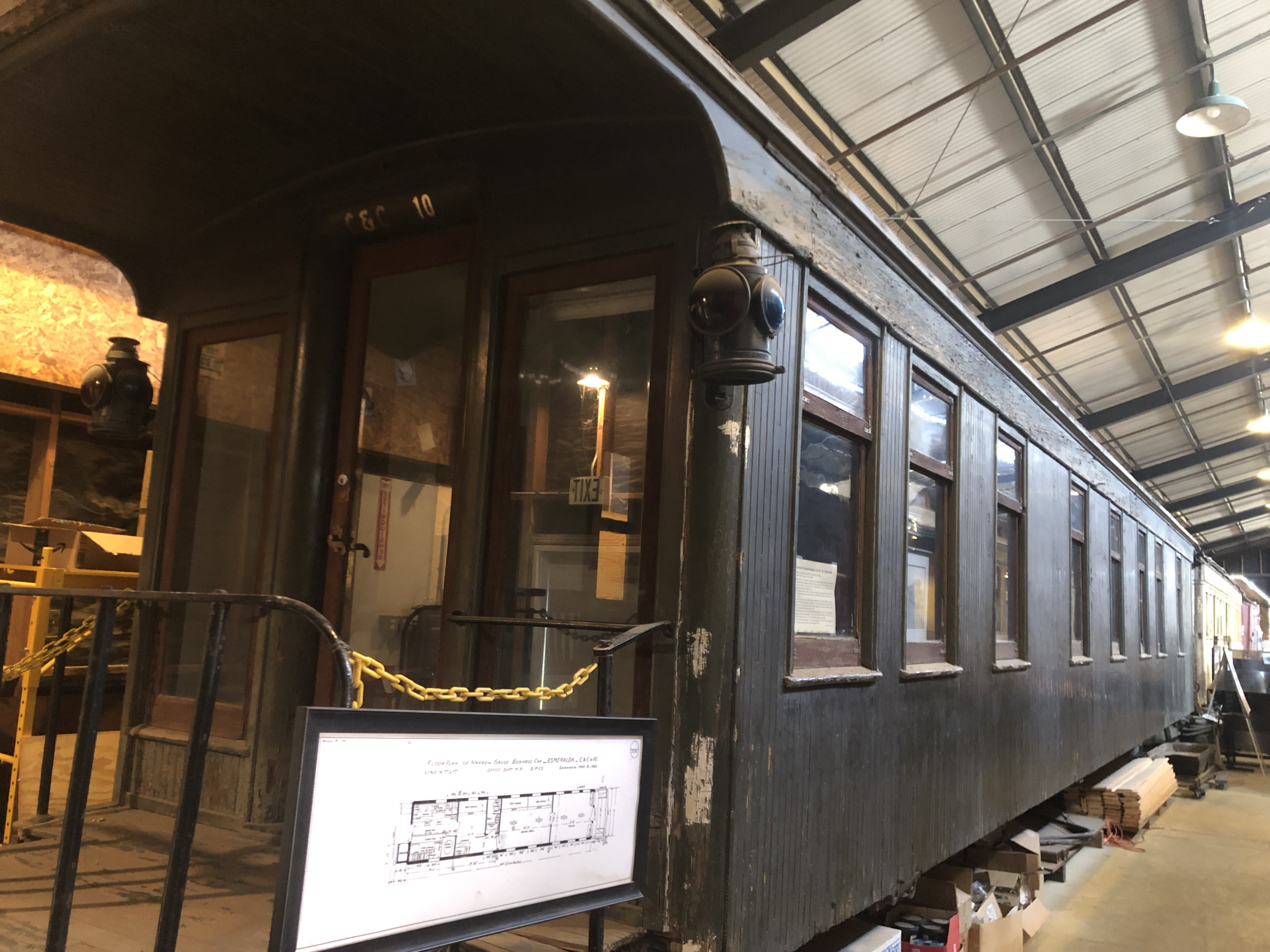
Carson & Colorado RR #10 (later, Southern Pacific narrow-gauge) the Esmeralda.

The Grizzly Flats collection includes a variety of narrow-gauge rolling stock, such as two steam engines, three coaches, several freight cars and a caboose. Most of it was donated by noted Disney animator and dedicated rail fan Ward Kimball.

In 1937, Kimball and his wife, Betty, bought their first rail car, a former Carson & Colorado Railway coach, for the scrap price of $50. They restored it, and bought a former Nevada Central Railroad 2-6-0 steam engine to go with it, naming it the Emma Nevada. Later, they bought more cars and a Hawaiian sugar plantation steam engine, which they named after their daughter, Chloe. Most of the collection was donated to the museum in 1992. The Kimballs also donated the funds needed to build the Grizzly Flats car barn there to house it, as well as the museum’s turntable.

The Grizzly Flats collection also includes other narrow-gauge rolling stock, such as Denver & Rio Grande Railroad gondolas and a flatcar, and a very rare car, the Esmeralda, which was a Carson & Colorado narrow-gauge, combination business car and caboose. The front third of the car housed the conductor and rear brakeman (complete with a cupola) and the rear two-thirds was the business-car portion. After the Southern Pacific Railroad purchased the Carson & Colorado, it modified the car and converted the caboose portion into a galley.

== Interactive signal garden ==
Built between 2000 and 2001 and utilizing a combination of standard railroad signal relays and custom microprocessor controls, the garden's first phase included:

- Two restored Magnetic Flagman grade crossing signals, both upper- and lower-quadrant
- Safetran V20 tri-light block signal, a new signal originally installed on the Southern Pacific Coastal Route and removed from service for standardization purposes by its successor, the Union Pacific Railroad
- Union Switch and Signal motorcar indicators which were miniature semaphores designed to warn maintenance crews of oncoming trains
- Union Switch and Signal motorcar indicator as used by the ATSF; this was little more than a pair of electric lamps and colored lenses
- Grade crossing warning bell c. 1910. This is a large, bronze bell with an electromagnetically driven clapper which alerted motorists to the approach of a train. It stood at an SP grade crossing in nearby Anaheim until the early 1960s when it was donated to the museum
- Union Switch and Signal relay cabinet, c. 1940 and used to house the electronics powering the exhibits

The display has since been expanded to include modern grade crossing signals, a US&S semaphore which once was mounted on a signal bridge spanning the Pacific Electric Watts Line and a century-old US&S banjo signal, used for both grade crossing protection and train control and one of only three known to exist. The others are on display at the Baltimore and Ohio Museum and the Smithsonian Institution.

== Notable exhibits and locomotives ==
=== Locomotives ===
Name	Class	Image	Type	Built	Builder	Status	Previous owner	Notes
Emma Nevada	2-6-0		3 ft (914 mm)	1881	Baldwin Locomotive Works	Undergoing Restoration	Nevada Central Railway, Grizzly Flats Railroad	Purchased by Disney animator Ward Kimball in 1938 for his Grizzly Flats Railroad. Ran from 1942 until 1951. Donated to the museum in 1990.
Chloe	0-4-2T		3 ft (914 mm)	1883	Baldwin Locomotive Works	Static Display	Waimanalo Sugar Company, Grizzly Flats Railroad	Museum has long term plans to restore Chloe to operating condition.
Ventura County Railway 2	2-6-2		Steam Locomotive	1922	Baldwin Locomotive Works	Undergoing 1,472-day inspection and overhaul	Ventura County Railway	Used primarily for special events. Donated in 1972. Has been operating since 1978 and is undergoing an overhaul as of 2025. Expected completion is late 2020's.
Union Pacific 2564	2-8-2 Mikado		Steam Locomotive	1921	American Locomotive Company	Static Display	Union Pacific Railroad	Formerly on display in Oro Grande, California until 1997, when it was donated to the SCRM for display. Originally Los Angeles & Salt Lake RR #2725, then Oregon Short Line RR #2564 (both UP subsidiaries).
Mojave Northern Railroad 2	0-6-0ST		Steam Locomotive	1917	Davenport Locomotive Works	Static Display	Mojave Northern Railroad	Donated in 1962. Operated at the museum from 1964 to 1975. Has not been fired since 1976 and is reportedly in very poor mechanical condition.
Atchison, Topeka and Santa Fe 108	EMD FP45		Diesel-Electric Locomotive	1967	Electro-Motive Division	Operational	Atchison, Topeka and Santa Fe Railway, Burlington Northern and Santa Fe Railway	Rebuilt and renumbered numerous times; Inherited by BNSF in 1995 and was donated in operable condition 1999 as No. 98. Restored to as-built condition from 2012 to 2018.
Atchison, Topeka and Santa Fe 560	FM H-12-44		Diesel-Electric Locomotive	1957	Fairbanks-Morse	Operational	Atchison, Topeka and Santa Fe Railway, Metal Processing Inc.	Acquired by MPI in 1974 as a scrap switcher. Donated to SCRM in 1989; Arrived 1990. Stored until 2020 before undergoing restoration to operating condition which was completed in late 2023.
Atchison, Topeka and Santa Fe 5704	EMD SD45-2		Diesel-Electric Locomotive	1973	Electro-Motive Division	Operational	Atchison, Topeka and Santa Fe Railway, Burlington Northern and Santa Fe Railway	Painted as a United States Bicentennial commemorate unit from 1976-1978. Retired in 2008 by BNSF. Cosmetically restored and donated by BNSF from 2021 to 2025. Mechanical restoration completed in 2026.
Union Pacific 942	EMD E8A		Diesel-Electric Locomotive	1953	Electro-Motive Division	Operational	Union Pacific RailroadChicago and North Western Railway, Regional Transportation Authority, Metra	Purchased by CNW from UP; Rebuilt and redesignated E8Am in 1973. Later inherited by Metra and retired in 1989. Purchased in 1996; Cosmetically restored from 2010 to 2012. Currently configured as E8Am mechanically.
Southern Pacific 3100	GE U25BE		Diesel-Electric Locomotive	1963	General Electric	Operational	Southern Pacific Transportation Co.	Rebuilt as U25BE featuring updated electronic systems. Donated in operable condition in 1988 and cosmetically restored in 2011. Formerly painted as the SP Bicentennial unit No. 6800.
Southern Pacific 1474	ALCo S-4		Diesel-Electric Locomotive	1951	American Locomotive Company	Operational	Southern Pacific Transportation Co.	Purchased from scrapyard circa 1979, restored sometime before 1982.
Southern Pacific 1006	EMC SW1		Diesel-Electric Locomotive	1939	Electro-Motive Company	Operational	Southern Pacific Transportation Co., Bethlehem Steel Corp. National Metal and Steel Corporation	Sold to BSC in 1967 and renumbered 15. Sold and purchased from NMSC in 1986 by SCRM. Stored at museum until 2005, when full restoration commenced, and was completed in 2020.
Southern Pacific 1543	Baldwin S-12		Diesel-Electric Locomotive	1953	Baldwin Locomotive Works	Stored	Southern Pacific Transportation Co, Chrome Crankshaft Inn, Kerr McGee	Renumbered many times; donated to SCRM in 1990 along with sister locomotive 1550, which worked alongside 1543 at Chrome Crankshift and Kerr McGee.
Southern Pacific 1550	Baldwin S-12		Diesel-Electric Locomotive	1953	Baldwin Locomotive Works	Stored	Southern Pacific Transportation Co, Chrome Crankshaft Inc, Kerr McGee	Renumbered many times; donated to SCRM in 1990 along with sister locomotive 1543, which worked alongside 1550 at Chrome Crankshift and Kerr McGee.
Southern Pacific 2954	ALCO RSD-12		Diesel-Electric Locomotive	1961	American Locomotive Company	Undergoing Restoration	Southern Pacific Transportation Co, Metropolitan Stevedore	Donated in operable condition alongside sister engine 2958 in 1995. Last operated 1999-2003. Currently undergoing full restoration to as-built condition
Southern Pacific 2958	ALCO RSD-12		Diesel-Electric Locomotive	1961	American Locomotive Company	Stored, Awaiting Restoration	Southern Pacific Transportation Co, Metropolitan Stevedore	Donated in operable condition alongside sister engine 2954 in 1995. Last operated on excursion service 1999-2003. Fired up in 2009 and used a few times and not operated since 2010. Candidate for next restoration project once 2954 is completed
Southern Pacific 7090	Wrecker Derrick		Steam Crane	1912	Industrial Works, Bay City, Michigan	Undergoing Restoration	Southern Pacific Transportation Company	Donated by the Southern Pacific in operational condition, boiler currently being restored.
Orange Empire Railway Museum 8	Baldwin VO-1000		Diesel-Electric Locomotive	1945	Baldwin Locomotive Works	Stored, awaiting restoration	United States Army, Port of Los Angeles, National Metal and Steel	Donated to SCRM Circa 1986. Operated mainline trains at the museum from late 1980s-Late 1990s. Last operated between 2002-2004.
Orange Empire Railway Museum 1956	ALCO RSD-1		Diesel-Electric Locomotive	1941	American Locomotive Company	Operational	United States Army, Department of Transportation	Donated mid 1980's along with sister engine 1975. Repainted into custom OERM colors in 2007.
Orange Empire Railway Museum 1975	ALCO RSD-1		Diesel-Electric Locomotive	1942	American Locomotive Company	Stored, Awaiting Overhaul	United States Army, Department of Transportation	Donated mid 1980's along with sister engine 1956. Repainted into custom OERM colors soometime in 2008. Currently out of service awaiting overhaul.
North County Transit District 2105	M–K F40PHM-2C		Diesel-Electric Locomotive	1994	Electro-Motive Division, Morrison–Knudsen	Operational asNon-Powered Control Unit	Coaster (NCTD)	Operated between San Diego and Oceanside from 1995 to 2021. Prime mover disabled per agreement with California Air Resources Board emission regulations. Donated by Coaster in 2022 and arrived alongside No. 5704 in 2025. Can be operated as Cab Car, though can be restored both cosmetically and internally, however the latter is highly unlikely.
Metrolink 800	EMD F40PHR		Diesel-Electric Locomotive	1985	Electro-Motive Division	Operational as Non-Powered Control Unit	Amtrak Metrolink	Built as Amtrak 396 in 1985, initially based in Chicago for revenue service, though did relocate to California in its final service years. Acquired by Metrolink in 2003 and used in commuter service until 2019. Prime mover was disabled per agreement with California Air Resources Board emission regulations. Can be operated as a Cab Car, though can be restored both cosmetically and internally, however the latter is highly unlikely.
United States Air Force 1601	GE 80 Tonner		Diesel-Electric Locomotive	1951	General Electric	Operational	United States Army, United States Air Force Scoular Grain J D Heiskell.	Museum's primary switcher. Originally built for U.S. Army in 1951 and later transferred to U.S. Army. Sold to Coast Grain and later J D Heiskell in Ontario, California. Acquired by museum sometime in the mid-2000s.
United States Air Force 8580	GE 45 Tonner		Diesel-Electric Locomotive	1944	General Electric	Undergoing Restoration	United States Air Force	Built in 1944 for the US Air Force and was assigned to Norton Air Force Base. Donated to museum after operations at the base ended sometime in the late 1970's.

- Santa Fe 108, is a 1967 EMD FP45 diesel locomotive. Featuring a 3600-horsepower (2.7 MW), 20-cylinder prime mover and six traction motors, the FP45 was intended for fast passenger service and is geared to run in excess of 90 miles per hour (140 km/h). ATSF 108 is especially notable as being the last passenger locomotive ever purchased by the Atchison, Topeka and Santa Fe Railway and was used on Santa Fe's finest passenger trains, including the Super Chief between Chicago and Los Angeles. Relegated to fast freight service in 1971 when passenger rail operations were transferred to Amtrak, the FP45 was donated in operating condition less its air conditioner by the Burlington Northern Santa Fe in 1997, but its size limits its use to occasional demonstration service and special excursions. It is maintained in service-ready condition and is sometimes used on off-property work trains. The locomotive underwent an extensive six-year restoration which was completed in late 2018. The completed restoration returned the locomotive to its as delivered external arrangement, including the original Santa Fe passenger Warbonnet paint scheme and original number.
- Southern Pacific 3100 is a GE U25B diesel locomotive once owned by the Southern Pacific Railroad and is the last operating example left in the US. Built in 1963 and originally numbered 7508, it became one of three SP locomotives painted in a red, white and blue color scheme in 1976 in celebration of the United States Bicentennial. It was retired in 1987. Numbered as SP 3100 prior to being donated, this locomotive is used in regular service. Like the FP45, the U25B is certified to run on any railroad, and its two-axle trucks and 2500-horsepower (1.9 MW) prime mover make it ideal for off-property work trains. It is also used to pull passenger-carrying freight cars on weekends and during members-only events, may be operated by museum members under supervision by a qualified engineer.
- The Union Pacific E8A 942 built by General Motors' Electro-Motive Division in 1953. It is one of 18 UP cars and locomotives preserved at the museum. The 942 is the flagship of the museum's UP fleet. It has been fully mechanically and cosmetically restored to UP's traditional yellow paint scheme with red and grey accents. The locomotive is occasionally used to lead a matching four car passenger train consist, nicknamed “The City of Perris”, playing on Union Pacific's practice of christening certain named trains after cities they originated from. Example: City of Los Angeles, City of San Francisco. The consist runs on select weekends, and occasionally for special events.
- The Pacific Electric collection consists of over 30 pieces of equipment from the largest interurban network in the United States, including local, suburban and interurban passenger equipment, electric locomotives, cabooses, and freight cars. Included are "Business Car" PE 1000, and interurban PE 1001, built in 1913 by Jewett; PE 1299, a 1929 "Business Car" rebuilt from a 1912 Pullman-built Southern Pacific trailer; three giant "Blimp" interurban coaches; several "Hollywood" suburban cars (featured in the film Who Framed Roger Rabbit), and two Birney streetcars.
- The Los Angeles Railway collection consists of over two dozen pieces of electric railway equipment and is the most comprehensive collection of preserved equipment from any large city streetcar system. Highlights of the collection, which includes examples of nearly every type of streetcar run in Los Angeles in the 20th century as well as numerous work cars, include the "Descanso", the only surviving street railway funeral car; car 3001, christened by Shirley Temple as the first PCC streetcar in Los Angeles; and several examples of the "California" type of streetcar that utilized a half-open design suitable to the warm climate. Cars are operated regularly over the only 3 ft 6 in (1,067 mm) narrow gauge trolley line remaining in the United States.
- Ventura County Railway #2 is a 1922 Baldwin Locomotive Works 2-6-2 steam locomotive maintained in operating condition. Originally built to run on coal, the locomotive was converted to oil soon after delivery to its original purchaser, the Cascade Timber Company of Reliance, Washington as No. 107. Last used by the V.C. Ry. on an excursion run in 1959, it was put up for sale in 1962, sold to a private party in 1964, and finally, it was transferred to the California Southern Railroad Museum in 1972, one of the SCRM's predecessors. In 1983, the locomotive appeared in the made for TV series movie: The Winds of War. The boiler was overhauled to present-day FRA steam locomotive regulations in 2001–2006; bringing the rest of the locomotive to specifications has been ongoing since its acquisition. In November 2021, the locomotive was taken out of service for a federally-mandated inspection and overhaul. Every 15 years or 1472 service days, whichever comes first, this process must be repeated. The overhaul and inspection is estimated to take three to five years to complete, and is estimated to cost $200,000. Updates and progress can be followed on the museum's official steam shop Facebook page.
- Santa Fe #5704 is one of 5 ATSF SD45-2s to be painted in the Bicentennial scheme, originally built in 1973 by Electro-Motive Division. The locomotive was donated to the museum in 2021 by BNSF. In 2022, the locomotive was cosmetically restored to its as-built appearance at Mid-America Car in Kansas City, Missouri. 5704 was donated in workable condition as the prime mover was intact, but required electrical work. The locomotive was expected to arrive at the museum sometime in 2023. As 2024 came closer, the locomotive has yet to arrive at the museum, still waiting for the "Perris Connection" to be reconnected, which remained stored in the BNSF Railway Commerce Yard. However, in March 2025, the "Perris Connection" was nearly completed, which means that 5704 was sent to the museum in early May 2025. Along with 2105, this locomotive arrived on museum property on May 3, 2025. Restored to full operating condition in April 2026.
- Coaster #2105 is a F40PHM-2C built in 1994 by Morrison–Knudsen for commuter rail service for the then new Coaster commuter rail in San Diego. It hauled commuter trains for the next 25 years until being retired in 2021 and replaced with Siemens SC-44 Charger locomotives. With the help of Mike Armstrong of the CoasterFan2105 YouTube Channel, 2105 was donated to the Southern California Railway Museum in 2022. The locomotive was moved to BNSF Railway's Commerce rail facility yard later that year. It was in storage from its retirement in February 2021 until May 2025, awaiting alongside SD45-2 #5704 for the "Perris Connection" to be reconnected. The locomotive is currently inoperable as a hole was drilled in the engine as per Tier 4 Regulation standards to ensure the locomotive cannot operate again. The museum hopes once it arrives at the museum, it can be operated as a cab car on their short stretch of line. Along with Santa Fe 5704, this locomotive arrived on museum property on May 3, 2025.

== Light rail vehicles ==
Name	Model	Image	Manufacturer	Built	Retired	Original owner	Notes
San Diego Trolley 1003	Siemens–Duewag U2		Siemens Mobility	1980	2015	San Diego Metropolitan Transit System	Arrived in March 2018.
San Diego Trolley 1008	Siemens–Duewag U2		Siemens Mobility	1980	2015	San Diego Metropolitan Transit System	Arrived in March 2016.
Los Angeles Metro Rail 144	Nippon Sharyo P865		Nippon Sharyo	1989	2018	Los Angeles County Transportation Commission; Los Angeles County Metropolitan Transportation Authority	Arrived in July 2018. First non-Siemens nor non-Boeing light rail vehicle to be preserved in a museum in the United States as well as the first Japanese-built rail vehicle to be preserved in the United States.

- San Diego Trolley Siemens-Duewag U2 cars 1008 and 1003 arrived in March 2016 and March 2018 (respectively), joining original San Diego Electric Railway PCC cars 508 and 528 as part of the San Diego collection. The 1008 and 1003 operate on select weekends at the museum independently, and occasionally as a two-car train.
- Los Angeles Metro Rail Nippon Sharyo P865 car 144 is the newest light rail arrival to the museum, joining the collection in July 2018.

== Shop and maintenance facilities ==
In addition to the museum's railroad equipment exhibits, its shops hold a historic collection of industrial machine tools and hand tools. One of these is a sheet-metal shear, which was made by Parker Manufacturing Company, a machine shop in Santa Monica, California. The company needed a shear, but backlogs in the World War II years meant a two-year waiting list to obtain one. So, the small company decided to design and make its own shear. It was made entirely of steel plate (no castings) due to backlogs in foundries. The design was successful, and desired by other shops needing machine tools. Soon, the local company was in the shear manufacturing business. The museum puts this unique shear to use in its Car house 4.

Other shop and maintenance facilities at the museum include:

- Machine Shop, capable of custom machining and metalwork operations, this fully equipped shop is frequently used to recreate custom parts for maintenance of rolling stock and projects. The machine shop also houses the air brake shop.
- Wood Shop, equipped for precision woodworking to help maintain facilities and rolling stock with wooden components.
- Communications, Electronics & LRV Maintenance Shop maintains the museum's railway radio communications system along with other electronics-based systems, and also maintains the museum's fleet of Light Rail Vehicles, as these vehicles are highly electronics-based.
- Signal Shop, maintains the railway signal system including all track switches, controllers, CTC systems, relays, automatic block signaling, track circuits and associated equipment.
- Diesel Maintenance Shop maintains the railway's fleet of diesel locomotives and associated diesel engines.
- Electric car maintenance is performed in workshops located in car houses 1 and 2, for narrow-gauge and standard-gauge cars respectively.

== Fire and emergency services unit ==
Functioning as an industrial fire department akin to those at refineries, plants, and some theme parks in the State of California, the unit provides coverage during most operating weekends, and major events. Fire/ESU command staff consist of current and retired career fire personnel of rank.

Most members of the unit are museum volunteers with a background or extensive experience in public safety and emergency response. The unit responds to fires and medical aid calls within the museum property limits, and along the museum right-of-way, in addition to providing stand-by services for any work with potential to ignite a fire.

Apparatus consist of one Type 5 brush engine, one Type 6 brush engine, and two rapid response sedans.

== See also ==
- List of heritage railroads in the United States
- List of heritage railways
- List of museums in California
- Perris Valley Historical and Museum Association
- Rail transport in Walt Disney Parks and Resorts
- Railroad Canyon

== Bibliography ==
- Amendola, Dana (2015). All Aboard: The Wonderful World of Disney Trains (1st ed.). Disney Editions. ISBN 978-1-4231-1714-8.
