= Wagon Wheel, Oxnard, California =

Neighborhood in Oxnard, California, United States

Wagon Wheel
- Neighborhood of Oxnard
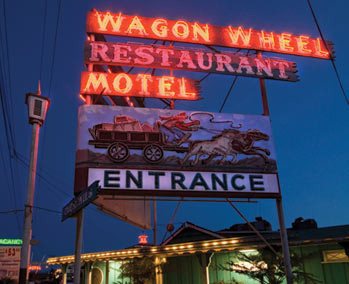
- The Wagon Wheel neon sign visible from Highway 101
- Interactive map of Wagon Wheel
- Coordinates: 34°14′21″N 119°10′58″W
- Country: United States
- State: California
- County: Ventura
- City: Oxnard
- Named for: Wagon Wheel Junction

Wagon Wheel is a densely populated, planned neighborhood of Oxnard, California at the intersection of U.S. Route 101 and Oxnard Boulevard. The neighborhood was originally developed as an office, motel, and restaurant complex named Wagon Wheel Junction with a convenient roadside location near the historic community of El Rio. The site in Ventura County became a popular stop for travelers between Los Angeles and Santa Barbara, particularly during its heyday in the 1950s, 1960s, and 1970s. The entire site was demolished in 2011 to begin the development of the community with 1,500 residential units. The Esplanade Shopping Center is directly across Oxnard Boulevard with The Collection at RiverPark shopping center located farther along Oxnard Boulevard on the other side of the 101 freeway.

== Modern redevelopment ==
Redevelopment of the neighborhood will include 1,500 housing units and 50,000-square-foot square feet of commercial space (4,600 m^{2}) where 450,000 square feet of old industrial buildings were demolished. The Wagon Wheel Family Apartments, a 120-unit complex managed by the Cabrillo Economic Development Corp., was the first new building on the site. The units were first offered to the residents of the Wagon Wheel Trailer Lodge. The demolition of the trailer park waited until completion in 2014 of the first phase of the apartments that has five rent levels based on income and family size. Over 200 apartment units were finished in 2018. Five hundred condominium units were constructed next.

By August 2022, 1,000 apartments, condominiums and townhouses had been completed. The completed project will have over 200 units set aside for families that earn up to 110% of the area median income besides the original family apartments. A restored sign with stagecoach driver and galloping horses was placed over the entrance to a business facing Oxnard Boulevard in 2023. The developer plans to restore the Wagon Wheel neon sign and integrate it in the development such as at the transit center.

== Wagon Wheel Junction ==
The Wagon Wheel Motel and Restaurant were part of a 40-acre (16 ha) mid-century real estate development in north Oxnard called the Wagon Wheel Junction. Constructed in 1947, it was the first development by Oxnard developer Martin V. ("Bud") Smith. Before Smith purchased the land in unincorporated Ventura County in 1945 situated four miles (6 km) north of Oxnard and six miles (10 km) south of Ventura, it was prone to flooding. After its completion, it became mid-century a roadside attraction at the intersection of the 101 Ventura Freeway and Pacific Coast Highway.

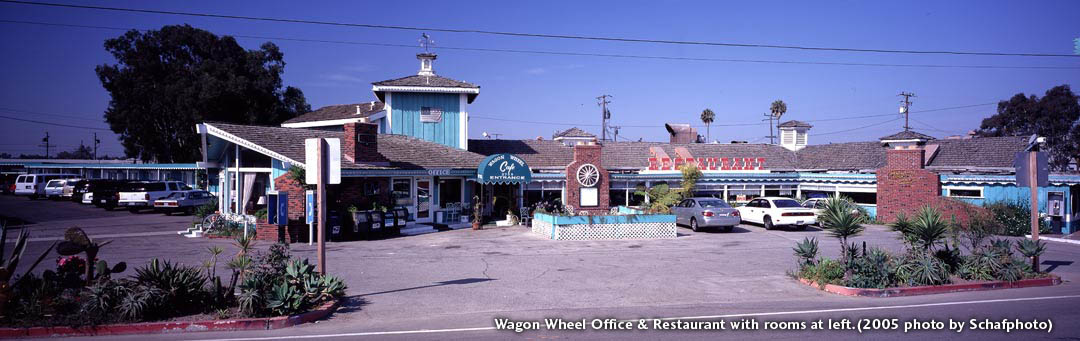
The Wagon Wheel's Office and Restaurant as viewed from the 101 freeway before being closed in 2005.

During excavation of the site, Smith uncovered branding irons from the Hobson Brothers' feedlot operations in the area in the 1920s, and he used this as the basis for his western theme. He began with the repurposing of surplus Seabee barracks purchased at auction in Port Hueneme, which he relocated in the typical sweeping U shape of period motels. It was the pre-pool era so the rooms all faced a grassy play area with picnic tables. He transformed others into a restaurant and office with a western ranch style.

He hired Hollywood set designer and carpenter Roy Beatty to design and create wrought iron lamps from branding irons and spurs, and furnish the original rooms with rustic wood beds, chairs and lamps. The theme for the property was typical of the then popular cowboy movies, with windows made from wagon wheels, and cowhide chairs in the restaurant. Along the highway real wagon wheels were placed in the median next to a rustic wooden sign that read:

WAGON WHEEL MOTEL
NEW AND MODERN
BREAKFAST SERVICE DAY AND NIGHT
SINGLE $3 DOUBLE $4
FAMILY SUITES

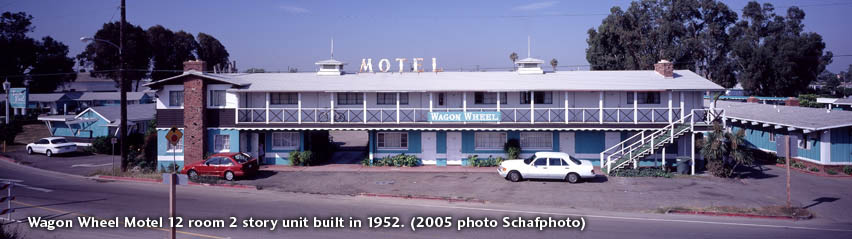
In 1952 this 12 unit addition was built to keep up with demand at the popular Motel.

Smith had 40 acres (16 ha) to develop, and the area soon had a bowling alley, shopping center, roller skating rink, industrial units, and a row of restaurants. These were all located on streets with wild west names like Winchester Dr., Petticoat Lane, Saddle Ave., and Buckaroo Dr. His restaurant row included the Wagon Wheel Steakhouse, the El Ranchito and the Trade Winds Polynesian restaurant.

When Bud Smith shifted into semi-retirement in the mid 1990s, his company, Martin V. Smith and Associates was the biggest developer and landlord in Oxnard with some 4500 tenants and over 200 properties from Calabasas to Santa Maria. Rather than retire and vacate his office on the 21st story of the Financial Plaza tower, he divested himself of most of his properties, but he kept the Wagon Wheel.

The demolition of the Colonial House, in 1988, left the Wagon Wheel as the only remaining early example of Bud Smith's vision.

The Wagon Wheel Restaurant closed in 2005. The Wagon Wheel Motel was closed in November 2006.

=== Landmark status ===
The Wagon Wheel Junction was a part of a fast disappearing piece of Americana architecture. In 1910, the Automobile Association of America planted the seeds of motel identification with its debut of the "Official Automobile Blue Book". In the 1950s, independent motel owners began competing with the cookie cutter Holiday Inns of the time with their gargantuan, green-and-yellow signage. Independents, such as the Wagon Wheel, developed the art of roadside showmanship through thematic architectural design and elaborate signage that employed porcelain-enameled panels of steel and used a myriad of lamps and neon. The thematic and imaginative sign of the Wagon Wheel and its "B" movie ranch architecture served not only as a style statement of a particular time in motel history, but has served as a visual place marker along Highway 101 for more than 50 years.

The project proponent hired a consultant to do a historic resource assessment in November 2005 of the entire 64-acre (26 ha) property, including the Wagon Wheel Motel, Restaurant and Bowling Alley and all other buildings on site. The results of this assessment concluded that these structures did not meet criteria for designation as a landmark. Since this first report found no significant resources, the California Environmental Quality Act (CEQA) would not compel mitigations, however for some reason the report still listed significant mitigations. The mitigations proposed a memorial to Martin V. Smith in a coffee kiosk on-site, prominently displaying the iconic features of the Wagon Wheel, the neon sign, a photo-documentary of the architectural qualities of the structures, and the creation a video and two 30 minute TV programs about Wagon Wheel Junction and Martin V. Smith to be run on local cable channels.

A Peer Review of the original historic assessment in the EIR concluded that the Wagon Wheel Motel did in fact meet criteria for landmark eligibility, so a second Peer Review was commissioned. Both the initial Peer Review by San Buenaventura Research Associates (of Santa Paula) and the second Peer Review by Applied Earthworks (of Fresno) contradicted the first assessment, and stated that the Wagon Wheel Motel, and Restaurant were eligible for landmark status, and in addition the El Ranchito restaurant and Wagon Wheel Bowling Alley may be eligible as well.

On March 26, 2007, the Ventura County Cultural Heritage Board, acting as the Oxnard Cultural Heritage Board ruled on the Wagon Wheel. The Board concluded that the Wagon Wheel Motel, Restaurant, and El Ranchito Restaurant were historically significant on the local level because of their association with Martin V. ("Bud") Smith and as an example of themed roadside architecture of the 1940s and 1950s. By unanimous vote, the seven-member board forwarded a recommendation of landmark designation for the motel buildings, office, and restaurant buildings, to the Oxnard City Council. Then in June 2008 the board added the Wagon Wheel Bowling Alley to their recommended landmark recommendation. In June 2008 the City of Oxnard began circulation of a Draft Environmental Impact Report (EIR) for the proposed development. The Oxnard City Council, voted that the Motel and buildings not be listed as an Oxnard City Landmark.

Preservationists and architects from the community and as far away as Los Angeles were on hand at Planning Commission and City Council Meetings. The San Buenaventura Conservancy, a local preservation organization, commented at all the public meetings, and then filed an appeal to the Planning Commission decision certifying the EIR; claiming that there was no cause for a Statement of Overriding conditions that would allow the demolition. The Oxnard City Council voted for EIR certification at the appeal. The City Council Vote approving the Project came on January 27, 2009. In January 2009, the EIR was certified and the Project was approved by the Oxnard City Council, demolition was scheduled to begin as soon as documentary mitigations were completed.

=== Lawsuit ===
On March 2, 2009 the San Buenaventura Conservancy, a local non-profit preservation advocacy group filed suit in Ventura County Superior Court against the City of Oxnard, claiming that the City's approval of the Oxnard Village Specific Plan project violated the California Environmental Quality Act (CEQA). The project, as approved, requires the demolition of the Wagon Wheel Motel, restaurant, El Ranchito and bowling alley along with everything built on the 64-acre (26 ha) site. The Conservancy case argues that the project can be feasibly accomplished without demolition of the Wagon Wheel, and CEQA therefore does not allow the Class 1 impact. The lawsuit requested issuance of a peremptory writ ordering the City to set aside its approval of the project pending compliance with CEQA.

The original Ventura County Superior Court case was presented July 10, 2009. The Judge sided with the city of Oxnard. The San Buenaventura Conservancy appealed the ruling and received a stay of demolition until the outcome of the appeal case: San Buenaventura Conservancy v. City of Oxnard et al. (CEQA) (Case: B220512 2nd District, Division 6.) On Wednesday December 15, 2010 a three judge panel at the California 2nd district Court of Appeal in Ventura heard arguments. They rendered a decision finding the CEQA process sufficient and affirming the Superior court decision on March 17, 2011. Demolition of the Wagon Wheel began a week later, and was completed in May 2011. The Wagon Wheel neon sign will be integrated into a small interpretive display about Martin V. Smith in the project.

In August 2009 FEMA released new flood maps for the Wagon Wheel Area, and it was noted that Wagon Wheel is directly across the street from a gap in the levee, and the new project would be in the flood zone.

=== Roadside architecture ===
The Wagon Wheel Motel and Restaurant was an example of American roadside architecture from the mid-century. The ranch-style office, motel and restaurant were originally built on the side of Highway 101 and Highway 101A (Alternate) in 1947. The office/restaurant complex incorporated a variety of roof lines, primarily low to medium pitched gables covered with wood shingles and punctuated by several decorative cupolas with weather vanes, and neon lighting. A free-standing 12-unit, two-story motel addition was completed in 1953. One of the most recognizable features of the motel was the giant neon sign that included an animated stagecoach driver and galloping horses. The Wagon Wheel was alongside the 101 freeway at the northern edge of a 64-acre (26 ha) site between the Santa Clara River and the Esplanade Shopping Center. The site also included industrial buildings, a trailer park an ice skating rink, a former roller skating rink, a bowling alley and a shopping center, all of which were demolished for redevelopment as a development with retail, for sale residential, condos and two high-rise towers totaling 1500 residential units.

The Wagon Wheel Bowling Alley was a 32-lane bowling alley built in the Wagon Wheel Junction across the street from the Wagon Wheel Motel in 1953. Designed by the Beverly Hills architect, Arthur Froehlich, known for his mid-century supermarkets and racetracks including the Hollywood Park Racetrack, and the Hanna Barbera Studio in Los Angeles 1962. The building had planer wall surfaces, an over-scaled wing wall and plate glass windows; the bowling alley included a restaurant and banquet room and was an example of the type of reductive Modernism that enjoyed great popularity in the mid-century. The bowling alley was known as Hoberg's after its proprietor, Ed Hoberg. The building was in continuous operation as a bowling alley from 1953 until May 2015. Demolition of the building began in October, 2015 as part of the Wagon Wheel area redevelopment.

== See also ==
- List of motels
