= Port of Hueneme =

Port in Ventura County, California, US

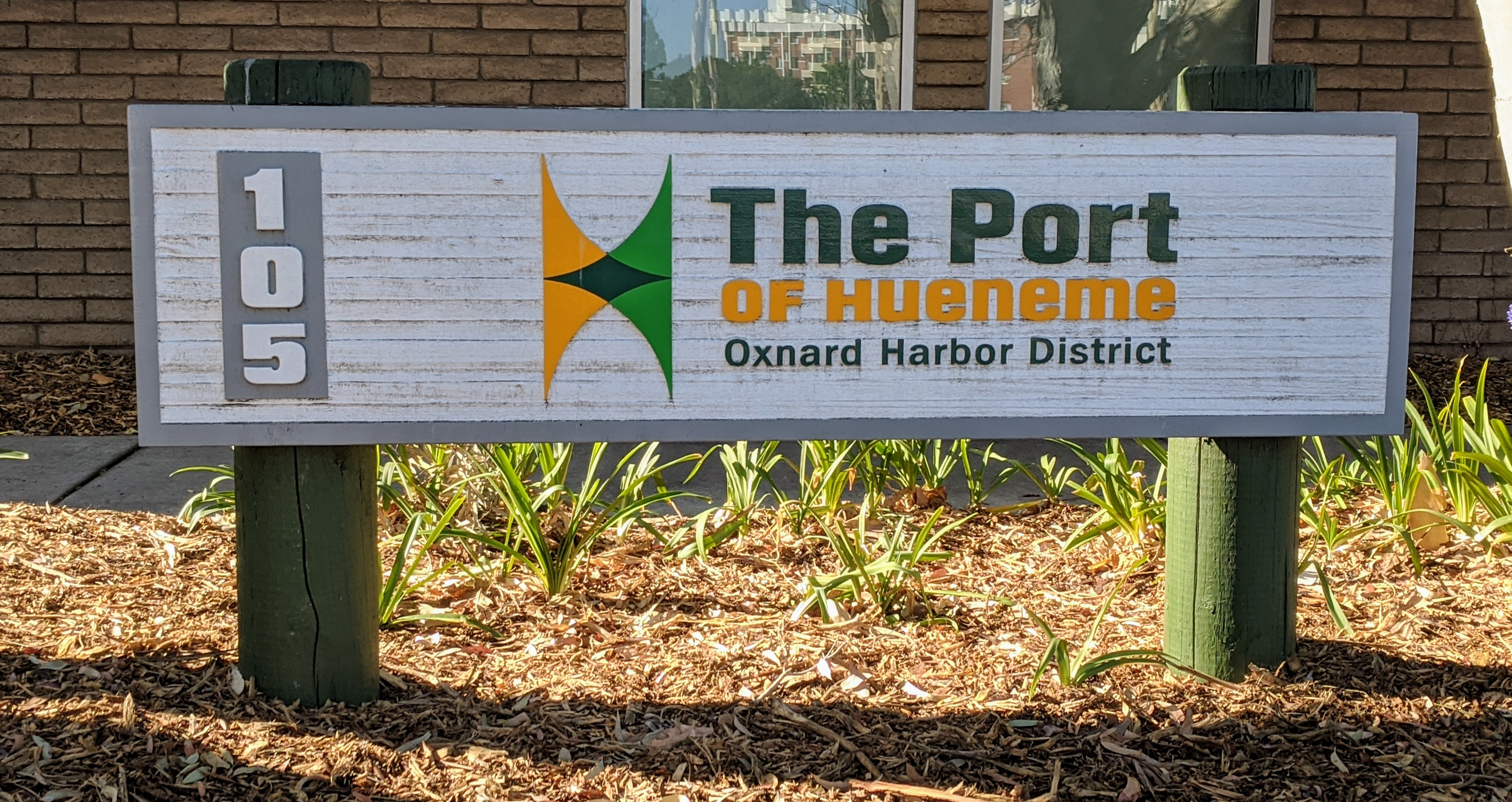
- Interactive map of Port of Hueneme

Location
- Country: United States
- Location: Port Hueneme, California
- Coordinates: 34°8′50″N 119°12′30″W

Details
- Opened: July 4, 1940; 86 years ago
- Operated by: Oxnard Harbor District
- Owned by: Oxnard Harbor District/U.S. Navy
- Type of harbour: Artificial
- Land area: 120 acres (49 ha)
- No. of berths: 5
- Port CEO and Director: Kristin Decas
- Motto: We make cargo move.

Statistics
- Annual cargo tonnage: 1.6 million
- Value of cargo: $10.9 billion
- Website www.portofh.org

The Port of Hueneme in the city of Port Hueneme, California, United States, is the only deep water harbor between Los Angeles and the San Francisco Bay area. Located in Ventura County on the Santa Barbara Channel, the port complex not only serves international shipping businesses but is an operating facility of Naval Base Ventura County (NBVC).

The original wharf was built to serve the new farmers on the Oxnard Plain and became the largest grain shipping port south of San Francisco. The modern port continues this legacy as a dominant port for agribusiness (fruit and other produce), liquids, fresh seafood and vehicles. Bulk cargo and automobiles are specialties of the port and distinguish it from much larger ports. General cargo includes household goods and oversized cargo. This includes providing support services for the offshore oil industry in the Santa Barbara Channel.

The port has a direct highway connection to the nationwide freight network which raises the status of the port and gives it access to more federal funding resulting in a competitive advantage. The port owns a railroad line through Port Hueneme and south Oxnard that is operated by the Ventura County Railroad and connects nationally to the Coast Route of Union Pacific. The District does not perform cargo handling operations as the companies shipping through the port take responsibility in cooperation with the port district. The commercial port operations have five deep-water berths.

The Navy controls the ship movements. As a shared port between NBVC and the Oxnard Harbor District, the U.S. Navy has over 4,500 feet (1,400 m) of berthing space for various ship platforms for use by tenant commands of NBVC: Port Hueneme and transient government contract/military shipping.

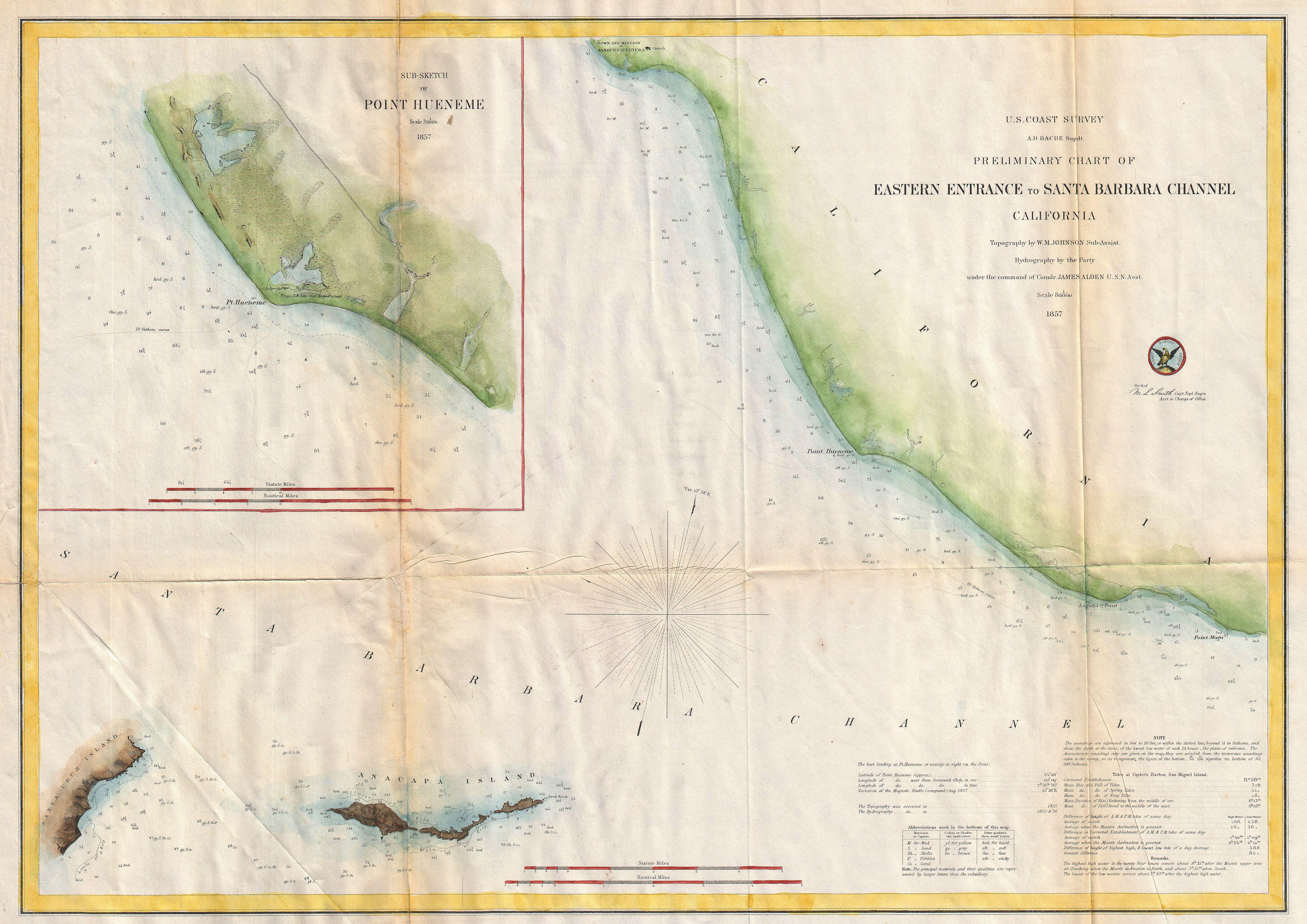
1857 U.S. Coast Survey Map has inset of Point Hueneme before the harbor was built

== History ==
European immigrants began farming on the Oxnard Plain in the 1860s but the area was isolated due to the difficult overland routes. Thomas R. Bard chose Point Hueneme as the site of a wharf to take advantage of the naturally occurring depth of a submarine canyon. The extra depth meant there was less surge while the boats were loading or unloading than there would be at other locations. Before the construction of a 900-foot-long wharf (270 m) in 1872, goods had been shuttled through the surf zone to reach offshore vessels. Hueneme soon became the largest grain-shipping port south of San Francisco and the wharf was extended to 1,500 feet (460 m) in 1897.

Three- and four-masted wooden schooners brought lumber from the north and carried grain, lima beans and sheep to markets in San Francisco. Teams of horses pulling wagons waited for the load of grain to be weighed in lines that stretched six blocks. Hoping to connect the new wharf with ore mines in Inyo County, Bard launched a campaign to build a road through the Santa Clara River Valley. Bard also platted the townsite of Hueneme to support the activity at the port and build a family home.

In 1898, the railroad line that had connected Ventura to Los Angeles crossed the Santa Clara River at El Rio on a new bridge. The line continued due south to where the town of Oxnard was being established at the site of the American Beet Sugar Company factory being built by the Oxnard Brothers in the middle portion of the plain. Passenger and freight traffic declined as they shifted to the railroad. Traffic was drastically reduced when the coast route was finished in 1904 and became the most direct route between Los Angeles and San Francisco.

The Harbor District was formed April 29, 1937 with an area of about 321 acres (130 ha). Building the port became even more important when a storm destroyed the wharf in 1938. On February 4, 1939, the groundbreaking ceremony drew hundreds of people. This endeavor was front-page news in Ventura County as the United States emerged from the Great Depression. The U.S. military took control of the entire harbor after the outbreak of World War II and significantly enlarged the deep water port. Bard's 62-acre estate (25 ha) was leased by the Navy during World War II and acquired by the government in 1951. His home, Berylwood mansion, remains within the military base and is used as a conference center. Several other large properties adjacent to port were also acquired to establish the Advance Base Depot which began operating May 18, 1942 to provide support for the Naval Construction Force, commonly called the Seabees. Massive amounts of equipment and materiel were shipped from here to the war efforts in the Pacific. The base was renamed the Naval Construction Battalion Center in 1945 and became an operating facility of Naval Base Ventura County in 2000.

The District has regained control over 120 acres (49 ha) and an additional 600 acres (240 ha) of private and public land serve support functions for the port. This has come about due to the gradual realignment and reduction in the nation's defense forces. For example, 33 acres (13 ha) were added to the port's existing 75 acres (30 ha) in 1997 as obsolete military facilities were demolished. Commercial shipping activities have consistently expanded and taken advantage of the additional space. Both the port and military base are within the corporate limits of the city of Port Hueneme.

In 2008 the port repaired the 3,050-foot seawall (930 m) on the south side of the entrance that protects the shoreline and marine terminals from coastal erosion. The project included construction of the Waterfront Promenade, also known as the Lighthouse Promenade. The path is wide enough to accommodate emergency or service vehicles and is lighted. The path provides paved public access along the shore by replacing a dirt path and connecting with the pathways at Hueneme Beach. The old seawall material was recycled by crushing the rock and using it as base material for the pathway.

Bananas were the port's largest volume product in 2014 and were continuing to increase. Chiquita was importing 7,500-pound of bananas a week (3,400 kg) making the port No. 2 in the nation for the company. The port’s goal was to be “the nation’s No. 1 port of choice for food production." The port and Ecuador’s Port Bolivar agreed to become “sister ports” in 2014 and promote the banana industry together. Forty percent of the Ecuador's banana exports go through Port Bolivar and 650,600-short-ton of fruit (590,200-metric-ton) were imported through the Port of Hueneme in 2013. The ports want to be more competitive and more attractive by sharing knowledge, policies and best practices on training, facilities development, engineering and technical services, security, supply chain logistics and environmental protection. The ports expected a mutual benefit for their customers through these cooperative arrangements in technology and policy.

Cargo volume grew 44% between 2009 and 2018. In 2019, the annual volume of cargo was 1.6 million tons in 2019 worth an estimated $9 billion dollars. The port formed a partnership with global container shipping line, SeaLand, in 2016 for their West Coast Central America route. The new route allowed products to arrive in Ventura County sooner and provided a convenient point to import and export goods from Central and South America for local companies. A modernization project that started in 2019 included adding an electric crane and deepening the harbor to 40 feet (12 m).

In 2019, the largest drug seizure at the port in decades was the result of a joint investigation by officers from Homeland Security Investigations, U.S. Immigration and Customs Enforcement and the U.S. Customs and Border Protection Office of Field Operations. In January, cocaine was found under the floorboards of two ships.

Beginning in 2021, shippers looked to the port during the global supply chain disruption. Vessels were arriving at full capacity as shippers chose carriers not headed for Los Angeles County ports and ships were also unloading all their containers here to avoid the backlog of ships at those ports farther south. While shifting to the port was not practical for ships with a substantial number of containers due to the lack of resources needed to offload, container ships that were newly chartered by suppliers were utilizing the port. A standing joint-use agreement from 2002 was also activated that allowed use of Wharf 3 onboard Naval Base Ventura County. The additional land and buildings helped stage the backlog of containers and get commodities to market which enabled the port to take on more cargo and avoid congestion. In early 2022, FedEx Logistics sent three chartered vessels from China with between 184 and 250 53-foot containers (16 m) with electronics, car parts, and clothing. Transit time was reduced by over 20 days instead of using the Los Angeles County ports according to the company.

Funding for ports by the state of California in July 2023 provided money for the Port Action, Climate and Environment Development (PACED) projects which includes removing dilapidated buildings, wharf repairs, and deepening berths. The port will also use the funding to install zero-emission plug-in units for containers, support power and emissions control systems that make vessels emission-free, and purchase zero-emission cargo handling equipment.

== Port operation ==
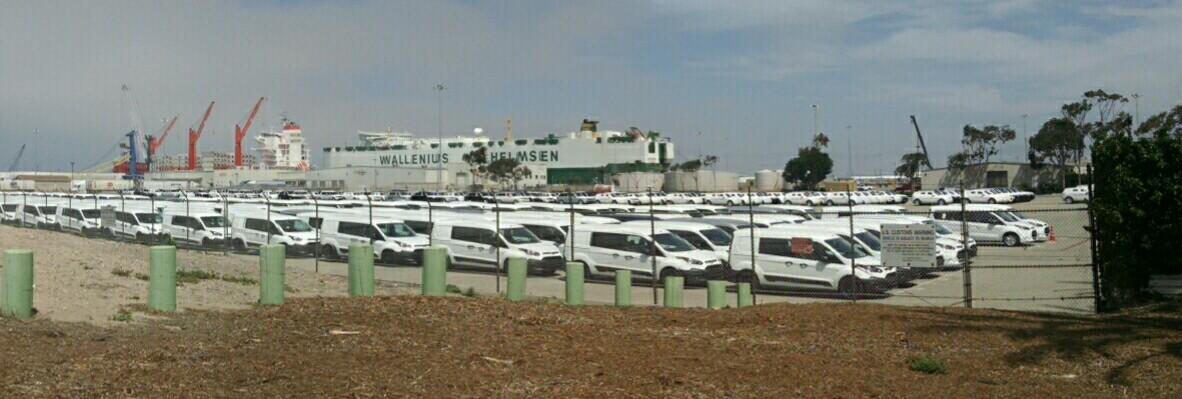
Various vehicles are shipped in and out of the port on large ships.

The ability to handle a diverse breadth of business is one way the port distinguishes itself from the much larger ports in Los Angeles County (Long Beach and Los Angeles) which are designed with the infrastructure to service container ships with approximately 5,000 containers. The port has five deep-water berths and two cranes for handling intermodal containers and bulk cargo. Vessels arriving carry between 1,250 and 1,500 containers as larger vessels are unable to use the berthing facilities. As an official port of entry into the United States and being adjacent to the Navy Base, the facility maintains a high level of security including monitoring those entering and leaving the port complex. Hazardous cargo cannot be processed through the port.

Automobiles and other roll-on/roll-off, high-and-heavy and project cargo are specialties of the port. Some 15,000 jobs are associated with the port including processing automobiles arriving in the port. The vehicles are largely from South Korea, Germany, Japan. The port provides a stream of delivery to auto dealers in a dozen western states, Canada, and Mexico via locomotives and car carrier trucks. While importing automobiles has long been a staple of the port, exporting them internationally began in 1996. This resulted from foreign automakers starting to build factories on U.S. soil in the early 1980s and domestic manufacturers seeking expansion in the international market. Automotive business moving through the port accounts for 85% of the total cargo value. Three auto processors are located less than 2 miles (3.2 km) from the port. The new vehicles are inspected and accessories installed before they are delivered to the dealers. Glovis is one of the port’s largest customers.

The port imports and exports over 313,000,000 short tons (284,000,000 metric tons) of cargo annually to Guatemala through the port of Puerto Quetzal. The cargo consists mainly of bananas and various fresh produce. The port’s goal is to be “the nation’s No. 1 port of choice for food production." Chiquita bananas arriving at the port are distributed to 13 western states.

General cargo can include household goods and oversized cargo, such as cryogenic tanks for Vandenberg Air Force Base and a Tunnel boring machine that was delivered to Las Vegas have come though the port. The port installed pumps to suck up squid from the holds of fishing vessels when the larger ports did not have the room and were not ready to provide this service.

== Military operations ==
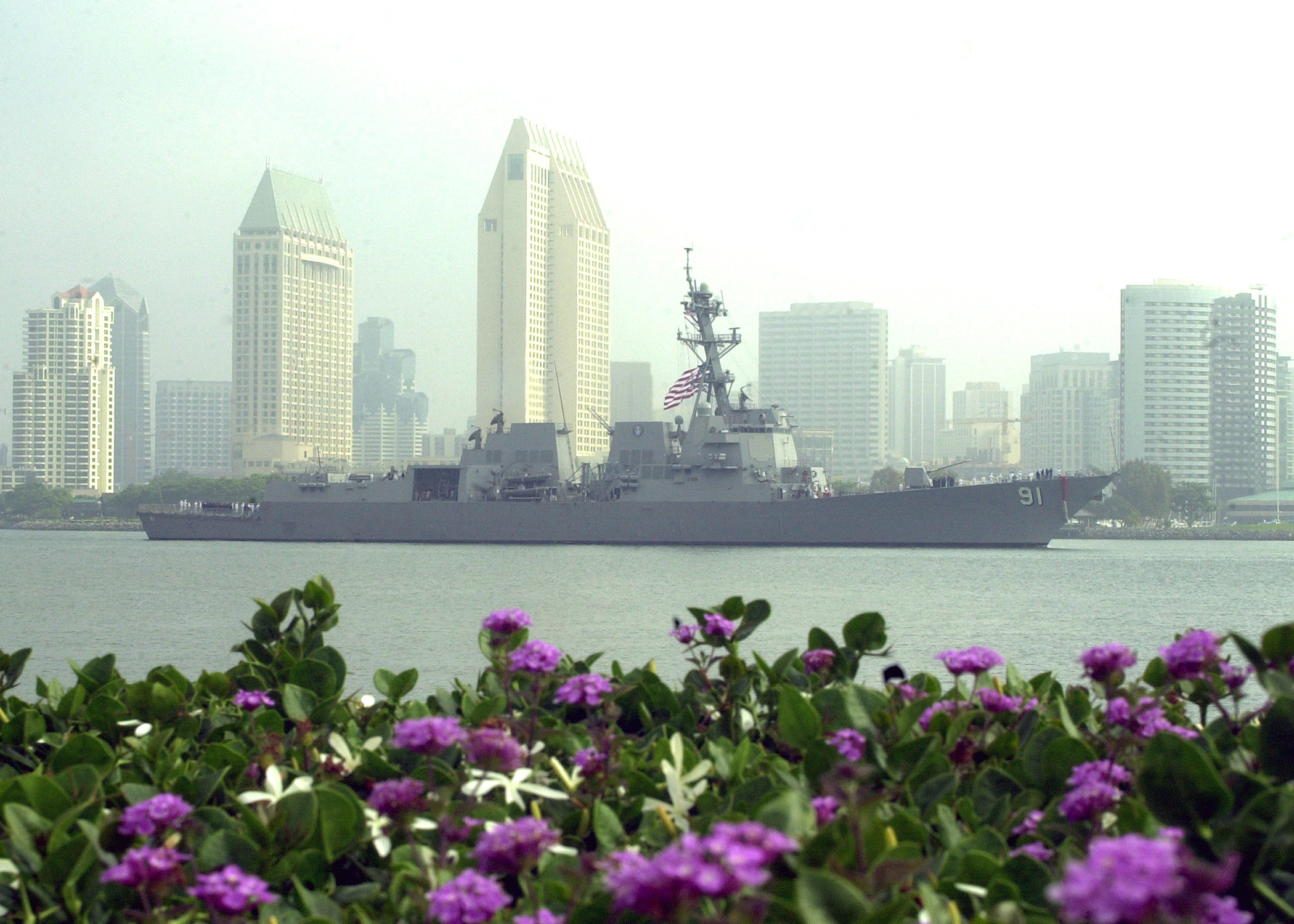
USS Pinckney (DDG-91) guided missile destroyer

NBVC Port Operations controls all vessels entering and exiting the harbor. NBVC:Port Hueneme and OHD have a Joint Use Agreement that provides up to 25 acres (10 ha) of secondary parcels for staging. There is more than 300 acres (120 ha) of lay-down space with portside access for 16 miles (26 km) of rail for on- and off-loading military freight for the various branches of service. Response to any "on water" hazardous materials spill is provided by Navy Port Operations personnel as they are first responder qualified.

The deep water port at NBVC:Port Hueneme is one of the few military ports on the West Coast and has been the site of a centuries-old naval tradition of ship commissioning. A ceremony at the harbor placed the following ships into active service

- USS Stethem was commissioned on 21 October 1995 at the base. The 13th Arleigh Burke-class destroyer was christened Stethem on 16 July 1994 by Mrs. Patricia L. Stethem, the mother of the ship's namesake: Steelworker Second Class (SW2) Robert Stethem, the United States Navy Seabee diver murdered in Beirut during the hijacking of TWA Flight 847 in 1985.
- USS Pinckney, an Arleigh Burke-class Aegis destroyer, was commissioned on 29 May 2004. She is named for Cook First Class William Pinckney (1915–1976), an African American, who received the Navy Cross for his courageous rescue of a fellow crew member on board the aircraft carrier USS Enterprise during the Battle of the Santa Cruz Islands. Pinckney was laid down on 16 July 2001 by Ingalls Shipbuilding, at Pascagoula, Mississippi; launched on 26 June 2002.
- USS Santa Barbara (LCS-32)

== Infrastructure and facilities ==
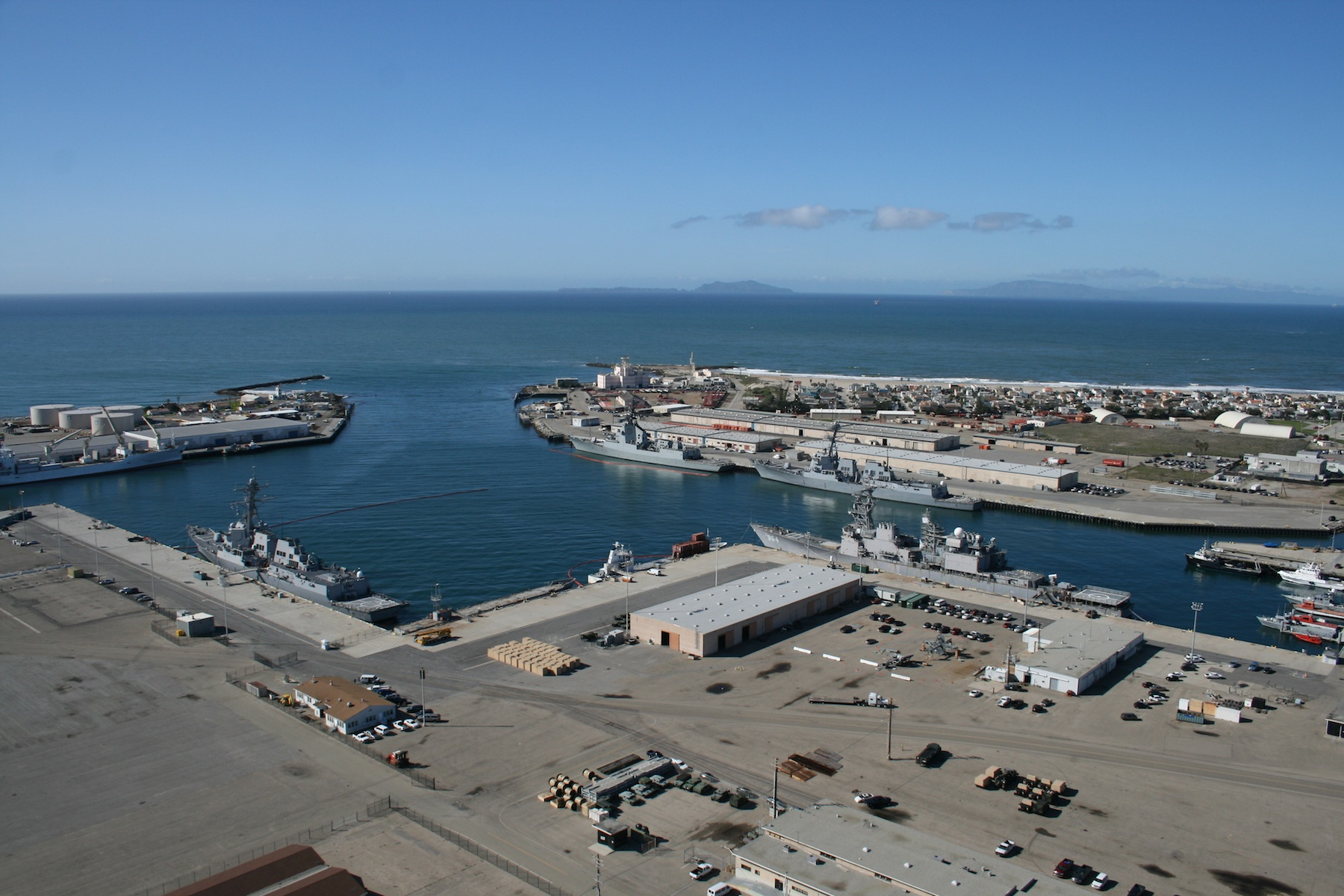
Aerial view looking northwest (2012)

The five deep-water berths are equipped with shore-side power capacity for vessels to plug in. The system was installed to comply with a California Air Resources Board rule requiring land-based power systems to reduce pollution coming from ships by shutting down diesel engines in order to prevent the emission of nitrogen oxides and particulate matter into the air. Two refrigerated container vessels, owned by Fresh Del Monte Produce, plug into the system when docked at the port. Both the ships also have a hybrid scrubber system to remove particulate matter and sulphur oxides and nitrogen oxides from the exhaust of the large marine engines that power the ships.

Two tugboats accompany ships in and out of the harbor and guide them to and from their berths. The port acquired two battery-powered terminal tractors in 2020 to move containers of fresh produce around the port. The American-made Kalmar trucks, funded with grant from the Air Resources Board, and a new tug, that came to the port in 2020, will further reduce emissions from port operations.

=== Land transportation network ===
The Oxnard Harbor District acquired the Ventura County Railway Company LLC, a 12.9-mile (20.8 km) short line railroad, in 2003. Ventura County Railroad operates the lines which connect the port, the military base, and other facilities in south Oxnard with the Union Pacific Coast route near the Oxnard Transit Center in downtown Oxnard. The port would also benefit if the rail corridor from the Port of Hueneme through the Highway 126 corridor to Santa Clarita was reestablished to carry Central Valley and Santa Clara River Valley citrus and other products to the port and on to foreign markets.

The Hueneme Road/Rice Avenue intermodal corridor was established by the district along with the cities of Oxnard and Port Hueneme, the County of Ventura, and approved by the state transportation commission in 1998 to deal with the truck traffic. This direct route connects the port to the nationwide freight network and raises the status of the port to give it access to more federal funding resulting in a competitive advantage. Funding was put in place in 2000 to improve the dedicated freight corridor by extending Rice Road southerly to connect Hueneme Road (Port Hueneme Road within Port Hueneme city limits) and totally rebuilding the interchange for State Route 1 at Pleasant Valley Road. The new interchange at Highway 101 and Rice Avenue was dedicated in 2014 after being improved and expanded from a two-lane overpass with narrow freeway ramps that required sharp difficult turns for trucks. The interchange and road improvements also made Rice Avenue, rather than Oxnard Boulevard, the main thoroughfare between the Ventura Freeway and the Pacific Coast Highway (State Route 1). An overpass has been planned for almost two decades along this route at the Rice Avenue intersection with Fifth Street (State Route 34). In February 2015, a Metrolink passenger train collided with a truck at this on-grade crossing. Funding is being allocated for design with a desire by local officials to eventually get the estimated $35 million need for this grade separation project.

=== Historic sites ===
Three historic sites are highlighted at viewing points on the Promenade: the 1872 Wharf, the Oxnard Packing House, and extant Point Hueneme Light. The Ventura County Cultural Heritage Board designated the "Original Hueneme Wharf Site" as County Landmark #24 in 1972.

== District governance ==
The Oxnard Harbor District is an independent special district formed in 1937. The harbor district is governed by a five-member commission elected at-large to staggered four year terms by the voters within the district boundary. The port is one of the five of the deep water ports governed by special districts in the state of California. The state's other six deep water ports are a function of the city in which the port is located. The District boundary includes the City of Port Hueneme, most of the City of Oxnard, and the unincorporated communities of El Rio, Nyeland Acres, Silver Strand, Hollywood Beach and Hollywood by the Sea. The district formed using the existing boundary of the Oxnard Union High School District which also encompassed Camarillo, a portion of Thousand Oaks and additional unincorporated areas of the county. At the time, this seemed like the best arrangement to provide a bond measure that would provide for construction of the port. Dissatisfaction with the boundary grew over the years and the Local Agency Formation Commission (LAFCO) recommended in 1972 and 1985 that the boundaries be changed to encompass the entire county. Oxnard and Port Hueneme officials requested that the boundaries be dramatically reduced in 1989 after a report showed that these two cities experienced a high percentage of the economic benefits of the port and suffered from heavy truck traffic on city streets, noise and congestion. LAFCO approved and changed the boundary to the current configuration in January, 1991. The commissioners must live within the district and LAFCO agreed with the cities that the boundary should match the area that is most influenced by actions taken by the port.

In 1983, the district and the City of Port Hueneme developed an agreement that provided a payment to the city of 3.33 percent of the port's gross revenues for improvements and services. The agreement recognized that city roads need maintenance due to the port truck traffic and provided for improvements such as road widening. After 9/11, security was increased and the entrance to the port was moved to another street. Some improvements were no longer needed and the port no longer used additional police services from the city. By 2009, the city and port officials were at odds over the need to renegotiate the agreement. The disagreement became particularly heated as the port resolved in 2013 to stop paying a percentage of gross revenues and to only pay for the actual costs of road repair. They also accused the city of using the funds for other municipal purposes. While claiming it was unrelated to the dispute, the city council put a new tax before voters in the November 2014 election that reworks the city’s business tax code to collect more money from maritime businesses at the Port and from the military contractors at Naval Base Ventura County. Voters rejected the measure and elected two new city council members who were on good terms with harbor district leaders.

== Community impacts ==
Much of the car storage is off-site in south Oxnard where several vehicle processing centers are located. Imported cars are frequently driven out of the port on public streets to these facilities.

A volunteer group has special permission to feed feral cats that take care of rats at the port. The group manages the cat population to keep it at about 250 and feeds them three times a week at different locations around the port property. Once a month, volunteers trap cats that are new to the colony, take them to a spay and neuter clinic to be sterilized, given shots to prevent feline diseases, and get their right ears clipped so they can be identified. The cats are then returned to where they were found and allowed to live out their lives. Many of these cats were dumped by owners. The biggest problem with the colony is that other people feed the animals and throw the population out of balance with the harbor rodents the cats are there to control.

MV Conception, a dive boat that caught fire and sank, was brought to the port from Santa Cruz Island overnight on September 13, 2019 to provide a secure location for the investigation. The boat was anchored near the island when the conflagration occurred at 3 a.m. on September 2, 2019. Five of the crew members escaped while 33 passengers and 1 crew member who were asleep below decks died.

During the COVID-19 pandemic, the port partnered with various organizations such as World Central Kitchen, local restaurants, and other groups to feed essential workers. Since fresh produce flows through the port, they were able to direct food donations by their customers to field and packinghouse workers who may not be able to make it to a food bank that is only open while they are working.

== Events ==
The Banana Festival is an annual event with tours of the port, food, and entertainment. Since 2011, the Port of Hueneme holds the event on the port grounds. The festival includes port tours, live bands, a kids zone, local vendors, and food/drink. Attendees spend the day celebrating the over 3.3 billion bananas that come through the Port of Hueneme each year and have the chance to receive free bananas/banana products from the companies working to transport bananas through the port such as Del Monte and Chiquita.

== See also ==
- Maritime history of California
- United States container ports
