= Port Hueneme, California =

City in California, United States

Port Hueneme, California Hueneme
- City
- City of Port Hueneme
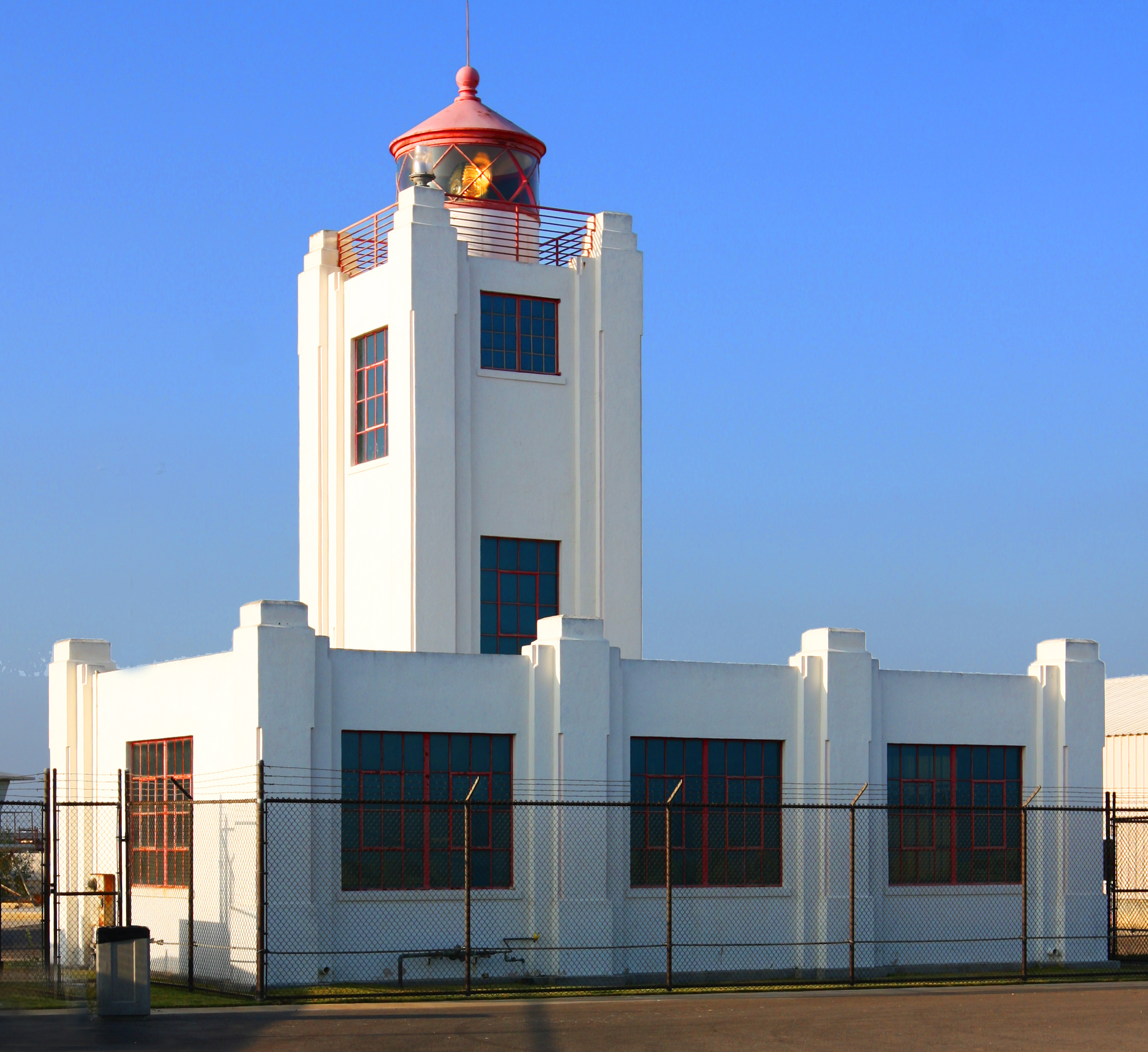
- Point Hueneme Light

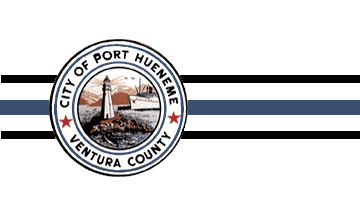
- Flag
- Interactive map of Port Hueneme, California
- Location in Southern California Location in California Location in the United States
- Coordinates: 34°9′37″N 119°11′40″W
- Country: United States
- State: California
- County: Ventura
- Wharf constructed: 1871
- Street grid established: October 1, 1888
- Incorporated: March 24, 1948

Government
  - Type: Council-mayor
  - Mayor: Martha McQueen-Legohn
  - State senator: Monique Limón (D)
  - Assemblymember: Steve Bennett (D)
  - U. S. rep.: Julia Brownley (D)

Area
  - Total: 4.66 sq mi (12.08 km^{2})
  - Land: 4.41 sq mi (11.43 km^{2})
  - Water: 0.25 sq mi (0.65 km^{2}) 5.35%
- Elevation: 13 ft (4 m)

Population (2020)
  - Total: 21,954
  - Density: 4,975/sq mi (1,921/km^{2})
- Time zone: UTC-8 (Pacific)
  - Summer (DST): UTC-7 (PDT)
- ZIP codes: 93041–93044
- Area code: 805
- FIPS code: 06-58296
- GNIS feature ID: 1652778
- Website: www.cityofporthueneme.org

Port Hueneme (/waɪˈniːmi/ wy-NEE-mee; Chumash: Wene Me) is a small beach city in Ventura County, California, United States, surrounded by the city of Oxnard and the Santa Barbara Channel. Both the Port of Hueneme and Naval Base Ventura County lie within the city limits.

Port Hueneme has a south-facing sand beach, known for its surfing. The beach has a wooden fishing pier and is about a mile long between Ormond Beach downcoast and Point Hueneme Light at the harbor entrance shared by the naval base and the port. The Waterfront Promenade, also known as the Lighthouse Promenade, provides a paved public access along the shoreline with two historic sites at viewpoints, the 1872 Wharf and the Oxnard Packing House.

== Name ==
The name Hueneme derives from the Spanish spelling of the Ventureño Chumash name Wene Me, meaning "Resting Place". In the 1800s, the postmaster named the post office Wynema after his company, Wynema Lighter Co. The town's name was officially changed to Port Hueneme in 1939 and was incorporated March 24, 1948.

In July 2021, the city council approved starting the process to change the city name to Hueneme Beach. During the adoption of the strategic plan in October 2020, staff recommended rebranding the city as a way to attract tourism, bring new businesses, and draw attention to the city's coastline. The initiative was voted down in November 2022.

== History ==
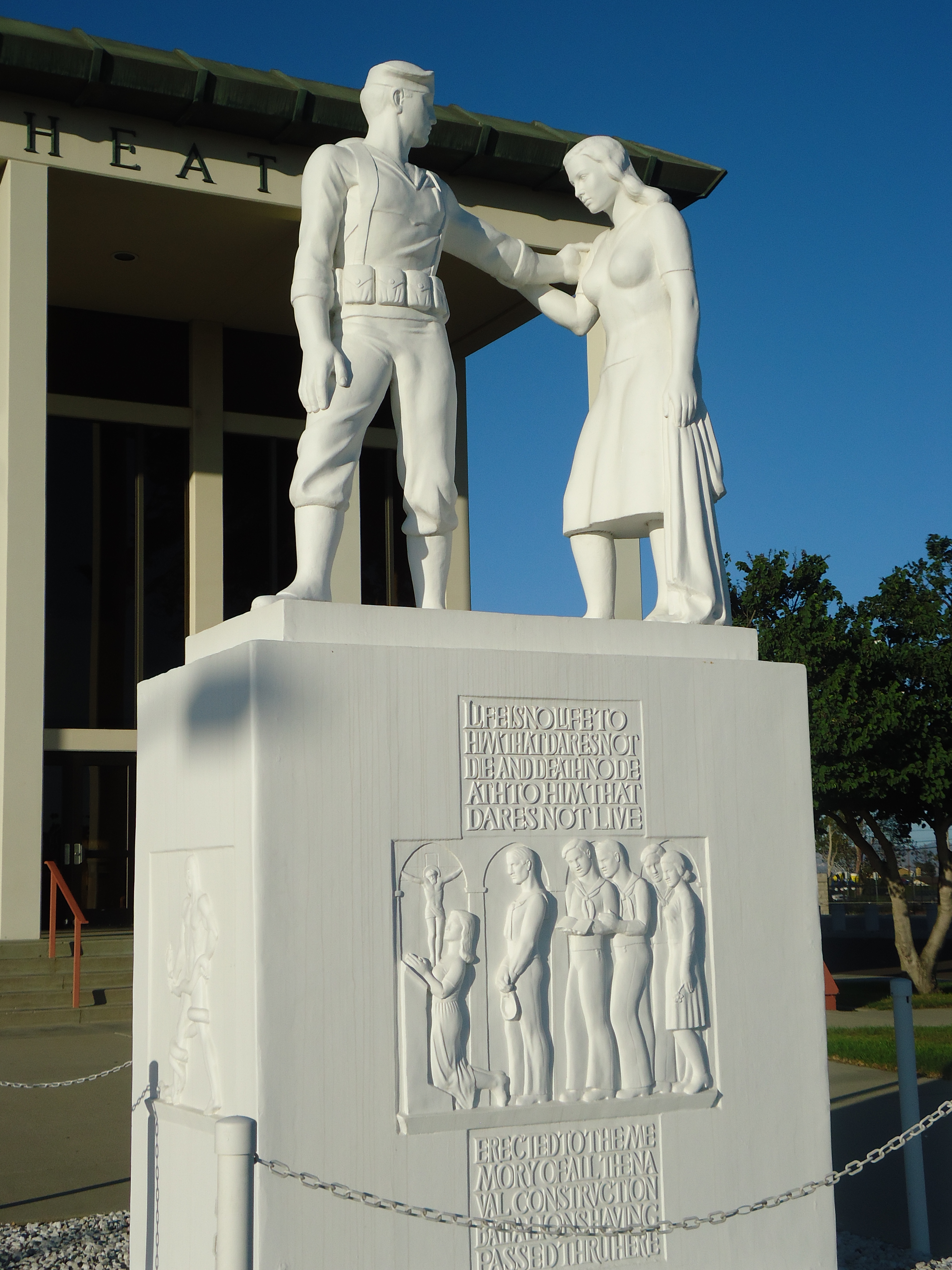
Monument to the Seabees at Naval Base Ventura County

Juan Rodríguez Cabrillo explored this area and the adjacent Channel Islands in October 1542.

Thomas Bard learned of the submarine canyon at Point Hueneme and took advantage of the canyon depth to construct the Hueneme Wharf in 1871 here. The existing street grid of the town was formally laid out in 1888. Until the construction of the Montalvo Cutoff that brought the railroad to nearby Oxnard, the wharf was the principal means of transportation for that portion of Ventura County lying south of the Santa Clara River. Hueneme was the second-largest grain-shipping port on the Pacific Coast between 1871 and 1895.

A 650-foot-long (200 m) pier was built in 1956 as a construction trestle for a sewer outfall pipeline. The fishing pier is now 1,250 feet (380 m) after having been modified over the years.

On January 31, 2000, Alaska Airlines Flight 261 crashed into the Pacific Ocean between Port Hueneme and Anacapa Island after a mechanical failure, killing all 88 passengers and crew onboard. U.S. Navy Base Ventura County, adjacent to the port, was the staging ground for recovery of the wreckage. The victims' families later approved the construction of a memorial sundial designed by Santa Barbara artist James "Bud" Bottoms, which was placed on the beach close to the crash site. Victims' names are placed on bronze plates mounted on the dial's perimeter. The sundial casts a shadow on a memorial plaque at 16:22 each January 31.

== Geography ==
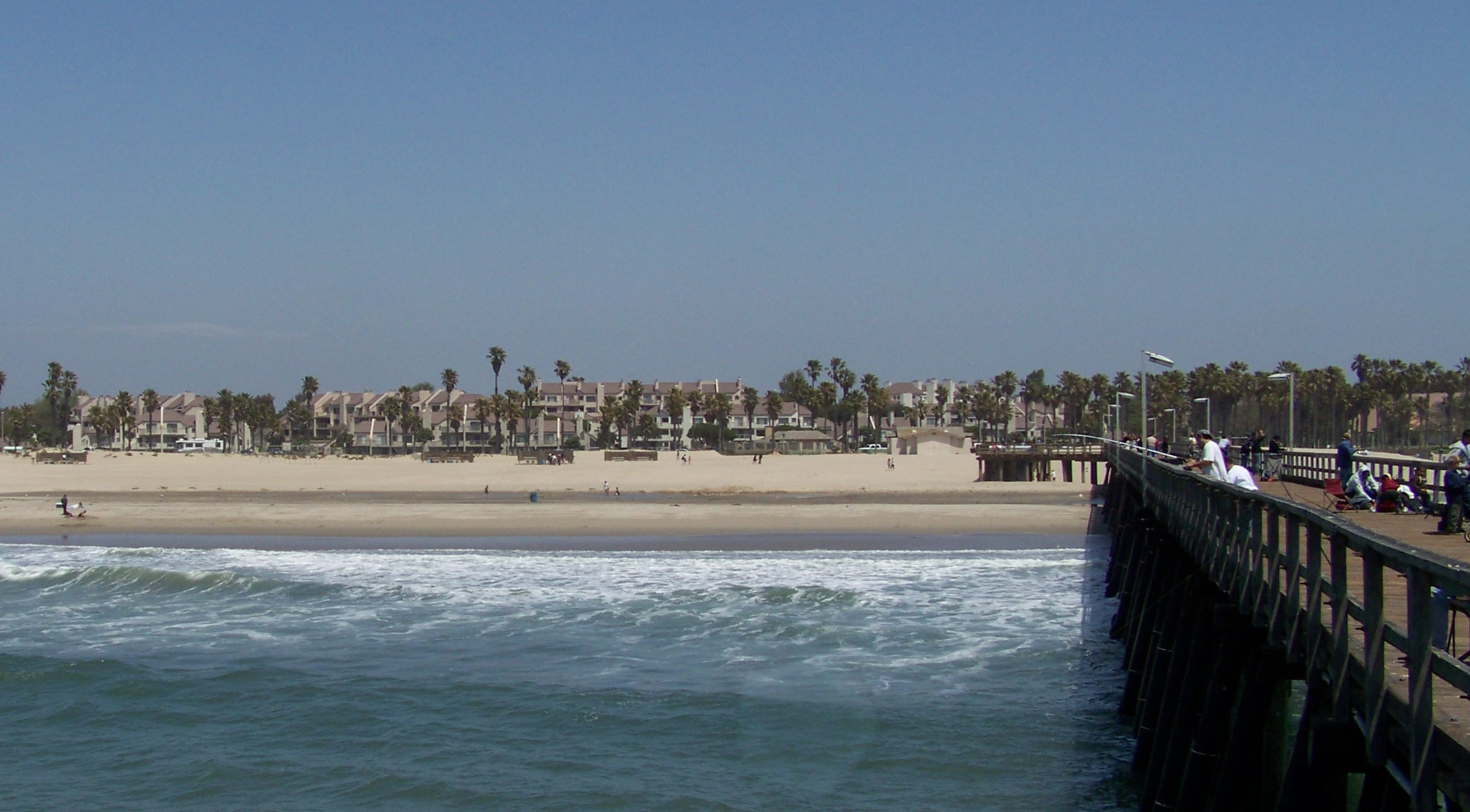
Beach and pier of Port Hueneme

Port Hueneme is located on the southwest portion of the Oxnard Plain on the Pacific Ocean.

According to the United States Census Bureau, the city has a total area of 4.7 square miles (12.1 km^{2}), of which 0.23 square miles (0.6 km^{2}) (5.35%) is covered by water.

=== Climate ===
This region experiences warm (but not hot) and dry summers, with no average monthly temperatures above 71.6 °F. According to the Köppen climate classification, Port Hueneme has a warm-summer Mediterranean climate, Csb on climate maps.

Climate data for Port Hueneme, California
Month	Jan	Feb	Mar	Apr	May	Jun	Jul	Aug	Sep	Oct	Nov	Dec	Year
Mean daily maximum °F (°C)	64.7 (18.2)	64.7 (18.2)	64.8 (18.2)	66.0 (18.9)	67.6 (19.8)	69.6 (20.9)	72.7 (22.6)	73.1 (22.8)	73.2 (22.9)	71.9 (22.2)	68.7 (20.4)	65.0 (18.3)	68.5 (20.3)
Mean daily minimum °F (°C)	45.5 (7.5)	46.4 (8.0)	47.9 (8.8)	49.0 (9.4)	52.7 (11.5)	56.2 (13.4)	59.0 (15.0)	59.2 (15.1)	57.8 (14.3)	54.0 (12.2)	48.7 (9.3)	44.8 (7.1)	51.8 (11.0)
Average precipitation inches (mm)	3.44 (87)	3.93 (100)	3.06 (78)	0.74 (19)	0.21 (5.3)	0.05 (1.3)	0.02 (0.51)	0.07 (1.8)	0.35 (8.9)	0.39 (9.9)	1.33 (34)	2.11 (54)	15.71 (399)
Source 1:
Source 2:

== Demographics ==
Historical population
Census	Pop.	Note	%±
1880	166		—
1950	3,024		—
1960	11,067		266.0%
1970	14,295		29.2%
1980	17,803		24.5%
1990	20,319		14.1%
2000	21,845		7.5%
2010	21,723		−0.6%
2020	21,954		1.1%
U.S. Census Bureau

=== 2020 ===
The 2020 United States census reported that Port Hueneme had a population of 21,954. The population density was 4,972.6 inhabitants per square mile (1,919.9/km^{2}). The racial makeup of Port Hueneme was 37.9% White, 3.9% African American, 2.8% Native American, 5.9% Asian, 0.7% Pacific Islander, 28.2% from other races, and 20.6% from two or more races. Hispanics or Latinos of any race were 57.6% of the population.

The census reported that 97.3% of the population lived in households, 2.7% lived in noninstitutionalized group quarters, and no one was institutionalized.

Of the 7,320 households, 35.9% had children under 18, 45.3% were married-couple households, 7.7% were cohabiting-couple households, 28.6% had a female householder with no partner present, and 18.4% had a male householder with no partner present. About 23.4% of households were one person, and 11.2% were one person 65 or older. The average household size was 2.92, with 5,057 families (69.1% of all households).

The age distribution was 22.9% under 18, 11.0% from 18 to 24, 29.1% from 25 to 44, 22.1% from 45 to 64, and 14.8% who were 65 or older. The median age was 34.9 years. For every 100 females, there were 98.1 males.

The 8,295 housing units had an average density of 1,878.8 units per square mile (725.4 units/km^{2}), of which 7,320 (88.2%) were occupied. Of these, 47.6% were owner-occupied, and 52.4% were occupied by renters.

In 2023, the US Census Bureau estimated that 25.8% of the population were foreign born. Of all people 5 or older, 50.4% spoke only English at home, 45.4% spoke Spanish, 1.3% spoke other Indo-European languages, 2.3% spoke Asian or Pacific Islander languages, and 0.6% spoke other languages. Of those 25 or older, 80.9% were high-school graduates and 22.7% had a bachelor's degree.

The median household income in 2023 was $76,655, and the per capita income was $34,707. About 7.8% of families and 10.8% of the population were below the poverty line.

=== 2010 ===
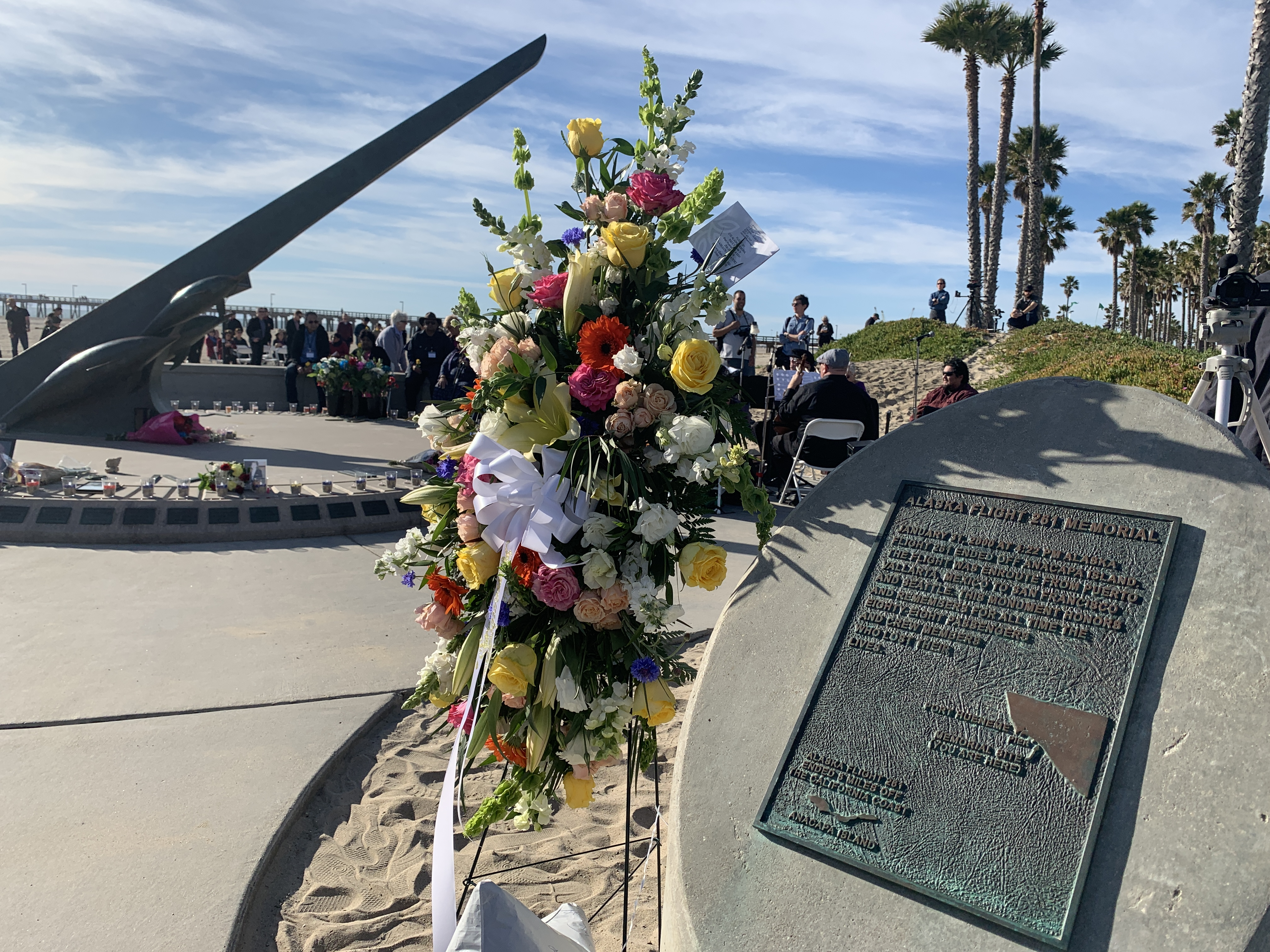
Alaska Airlines Flight 261 memorial

The 2010 United States census reported that Port Hueneme had a population of 21,723. The population density was 4,651.2 inhabitants per square mile (1,795.8/km^{2}). The racial makeup of Port Hueneme was 56.9% White, 5.1% African American, 1.4% Native American, 6.0% Asian, 0.5% Pacific Islander, 24.0% from other races, and 6.1% from two or more races. Hispanics or Latinos of any race were 52.3% of the population.

The census reported that 96.0% of the population lived in households, 4.0% lived in noninstitutionalized group quarters, and none were institutionalized.

Of the 7,080 households, 40.0% had children under 18 living in them, 46.1% were opposite-sex married couples living together, 15.8% had a female householder with no husband present, and 6.2% had a male householder with no wife present; 6.5% were unmarried opposite-sex partnerships, and 0.7% were same-sex married couples or partnerships; 24.9% were made up of individuals, and 10.9% had someone living alone who was 65 or older. The average household size was 2.95, with 68.2% of them families]]; the average family size was 3.52.

The age distribution was 26.6% under 18, 12.5% from 18 to 24, 28.8% from 25 to 44, 21.1% from 45 to 64, and 11.0% were 65 or older. The median age was 31.3 years. For every 100 females, there were 103.2 males. For every 100 females 18 and over, there were 101.1 males.

The 8,131 housing units had an average density of 1,741.0 units per square mile (672.2 units/km^{2}), of which 48.3% were owner-occupied and 51.7% were occupied by renters. The homeowner vacancy rate was 2.7%; the rental vacancy rate was 6.0%; 44.9% of the population lived in owner-occupied housing units, and 51.1% lived in rental housing units.

== Economy ==
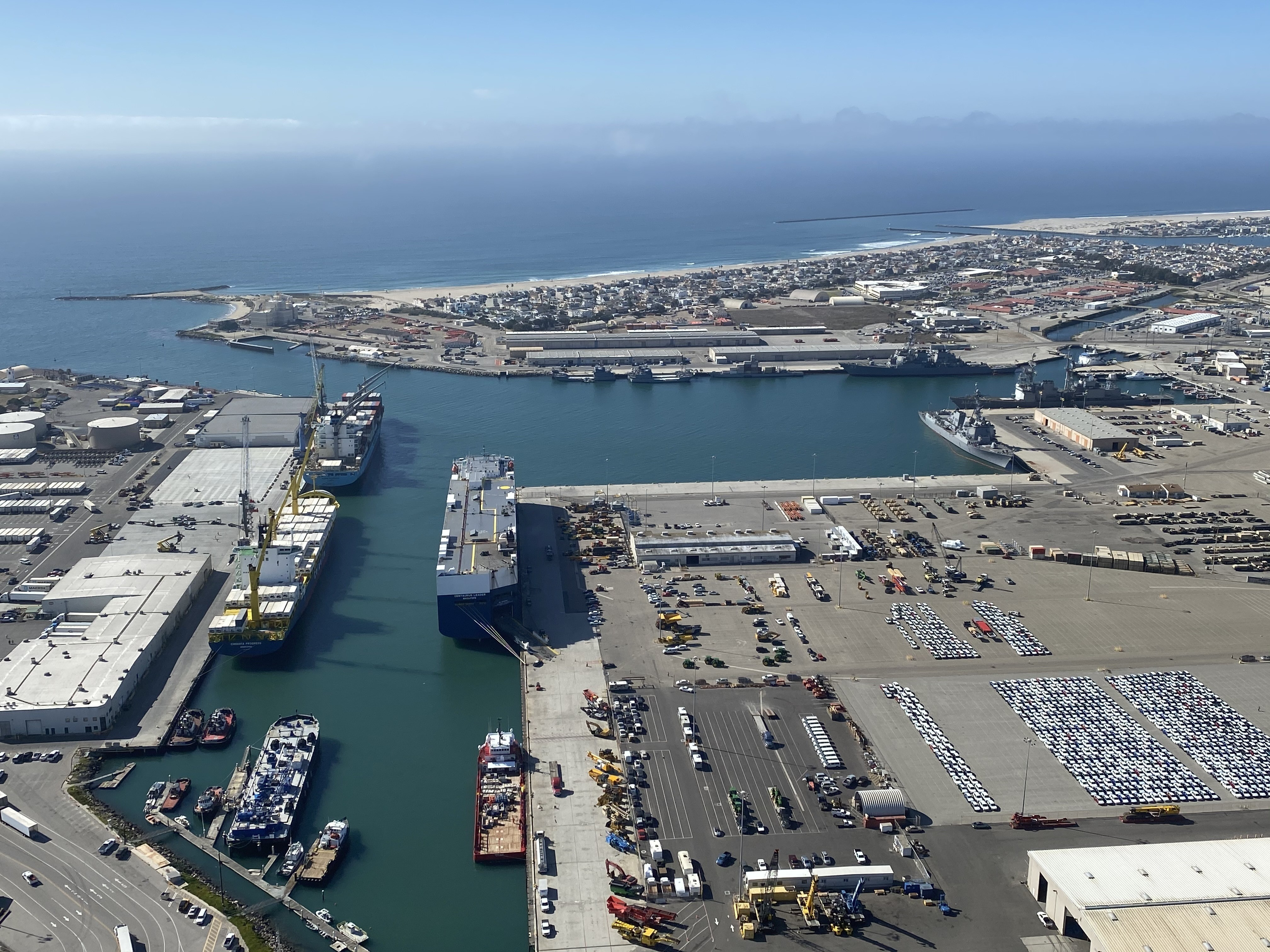
Aerial view of the Port of Hueneme

The business district is on Channel Islands Boulevard on the north side of the city separated from the original downtown by the naval base.

=== Cannabis ===
Under the legalization of the sale and distribution of cannabis in California, the city developed a model program as the only city in Ventura County to initially allow multiple types of marijuana businesses, including cultivation, manufacturing, and retail sales. Commercial activities, such as growing, testing, and selling cannabis within their jurisdiction may be regulated by each city by licensing none or only some of these activities, but local governments may not prohibit adults from growing, using, or transporting marijuana for personal use. The retail shops in the city are required to have armed security on the premises during hours of operation, with some businesses deciding to have a guard nearby 24 hours a day. Security video feeds from the shops must be accessible to the police at all times.

By the end of 2018, the city had four recreational marijuana storefronts. As one of the few cities with retail, the city found that about 10 percent of the customers are from Port Hueneme with approximately 50 percent from the adjacent city of Oxnard. About 15 percent were from Camarillo and 10 percent from Ventura with the remaining 15 percent of customers coming from other areas. During a city sponsored workshop in 2019, the chief of the state Bureau of Cannabis Control, which regulates the industry said, “I think you have a lot to be proud of this city. This city has shown if it's done right, it really works well.” In 2022, the city council approved allowing cannabis events with sale and consumption at the Hueneme Beach Park parking lots after a small cannabis farmers market in December 2021 generated about $4,000 in city revenue. Only one event of the series of six events occurred after the first event had poor attendance and sales, prompting the event organizers to cancel the remaining 5 approved events. The city was the first in the county to allow cannabis lounges in 2022, which opened in 2023.

About 5% of gross revenues from these businesses is collected by the city per agreements that allow them to operate in the city. This has helped with a deficit city budget. The city was able to produce a balanced budget without dipping into reserves in 2019 for the first time in many years partially due to the cannabis revenue. In the fiscal year 2020, the city collected $2.2 million. Businesses are required to contribute one percent to community activities.

Near the end of 2023, the city had nine dispensaries, seven delivery-only services, and one microbusiness that has cannabis retail, cultivation, and distribution. The fees collected by the city peaked at $2.9 million in 2022 with businesses reporting stagnant or falling revenue in 2023.

=== The Port ===
The Port of Hueneme, shared with Oxnard Harbor District and Naval Base Ventura County, is the only deep-water port between the Los Angeles and the San Francisco, and the only Navy-controlled harbor between San Diego Bay and Puget Sound, Washington.

The harbor is a shipping-and-receiving point for a wide variety of goods destined for the Los Angeles Basin and beyond, including automobiles, pineapples, and bananas. Agricultural products such as onions, strawberries, and flowers are shipped. The city receives about $2 million in tax revenue annually from the port.

In 2014, the beach at Port Hueneme had been eroding for the 60 years since it was built as a commercial port, with jetties that block the natural flow of sand. After the US Navy took over the port during World War II, the government had the responsibility to put back the sand that had disappeared. Funds were lacking until 2013, when nearly $12 million in funding were announced as available to replenish the sand at the beach, the money coming from various branches of the government. Furthermore, a continuing, expensive routine to prevent ocean water from sitting on the city streets exists.

== Arts and culture ==
=== Hueneme Beach Festival ===
Hueneme Beach Festival logo

Since 1998, the city of Port Hueneme holds an annual theme-based beach festival at 550 East Surfside Drive. This two-day event is held in mid- to late August. Entertainment includes live music, rides, games, attractions, and food and vendor booths and exhibits.

=== Hueneme Harbor Days (Historic) ===
Prior to the Hueneme Beach Festival, the board of directors ran the Port Hueneme Harbor Days Festival and Parade with food, bands, entertainment, kids' attractions, vendor booths, and activities, such as kite-flying contests, sand-sculpture contests, metal-detection contests, and a long time ago, bathing suit contests. HHB was started in 1950 and ended in 2001, after 51 years of successful operations. The demise came from a lack of city support, and financial troubles such as an increases in fees for insurance, and food handling regulations. There are pictures of the early Hueneme Harbor Days Festival at the local history museum.

=== Banana Festival ===
The Banana Festival is an annual event with tours of the port, food, and entertainment. Since 2011, the Port of Hueneme holds the event on the port grounds. The festival includes port tours, live bands, a kids' zone, local vendors, and food/drink. Attendees spend the day celebrating the over 3.3 billion bananas that come through the Port of Hueneme each year and have the chance to receive free bananas/banana products from the companies working to transport bananas through the port such as Del Monte and Chiquita.

== Sports ==
This south-facing beach offers pitching waves year-round from a multitude of swell directions. As a result of great surf, Port Hueneme surfers are territorial and localism has been known to be a problem. In 2025, the Bubbling Springs Park's baseball and T-ball fields received a $15.4 million upgrade and were reopened for the community. The park is home to Port Hueneme Little League and hosts youth baseball games for kids in the area. The improvements make the park a central spot for local families and young athletes to enjoy organized sports and gatherings.

== Education ==
Most of the city of Port Hueneme lies within the boundaries of the Hueneme School District. Portions of the city north of Channel Islands are served by Oxnard Elementary School District. Elementary schools within Port Hueneme include: Hueneme Elementary, Richard Bard Elementary, Parkview Elementary, and Sunkist Elementary.

Hueneme High School of the Oxnard Union High School District serves most of the city. Portions of the city north of Channel Islands are served by Oxnard High School.

Libraries

Ventura County Library serves the community through its local branch, the Ray D. Prueter Library.

== See also ==
- List of ports in the United States
- Alaska Airlines Flight 261
