= Santa Clara Avenue Oil Field =

Oil field in Ventura County, California

Coordinates: 34.2395°N 119.1247°W

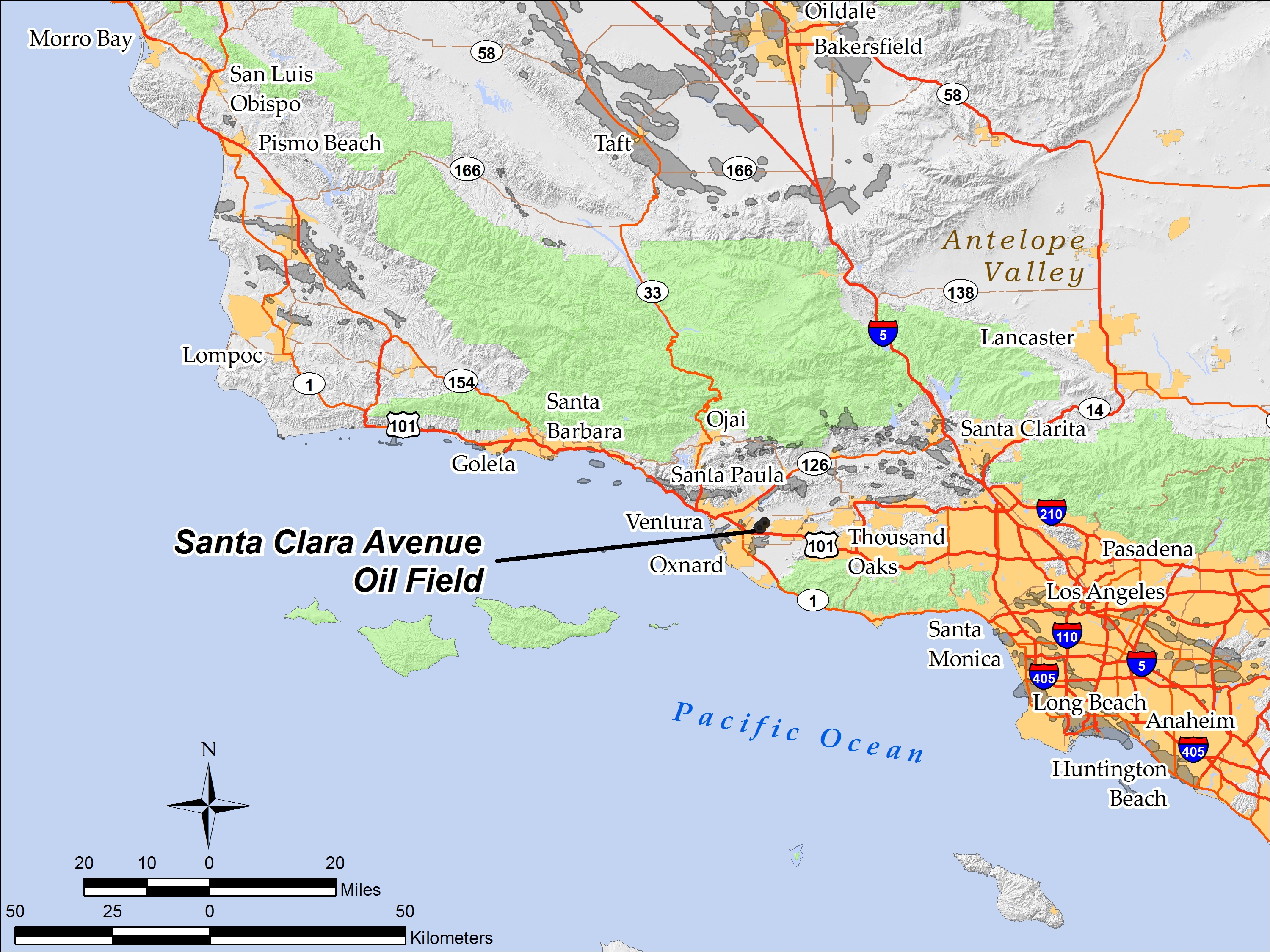
- The Santa Clara Avenue Oil Field in Ventura County, California.
- Country: United States
- Region: Ventura Basin
- Location: Ventura County, California
- Offshore/onshore: onshore

Field history
- Discovery: 1972
- Start of development: 1972
- Start of production: 1972
- Peak year: 1977

Production
- Current production of oil: 211 barrels per day (~10,500 t/a)
- Year of current production of oil: 2009
- Estimated oil in place: 1.335 million barrels (~1.821×10^{5} t)
- Producing formations: Sespe Formation

The Santa Clara Avenue Oil Field is an oil field in Ventura County, California, about six miles southeast of the city of Ventura and four miles northeast of Oxnard. It is produced entirely from two walled drilling islands along Santa Clara Avenue, each containing multiple directionally drilled wells. The field is within an agricultural area being encroached on several sides by urban development. As of 2010, the field reported 1,335,000 barrels of recoverable oil remaining and had 18 active oil wells.

== Geographic setting ==
The field is within the Oxnard Plain, a rich agricultural region subject to encroachment from urban development from the cities of Oxnard, Ventura, and Camarillo. Oil production and storage equipment are surrounded by agricultural fields and orchards. Crops grown nearby include onions, broccoli, and strawberries. U.S. Highway 101 runs along the south edge of the oil field, and Santa Clara Avenue runs through it from southwest to northeast, ending at California State Route 118. The unincorporated town of El Rio is west of the field, and the unincorporated development of Nyeland Acres lies to the south, adjoining Oxnard. The total surface area of the productive part of the field is 180 acres (73 ha).

The climate in the region is Mediterranean, with cool, rainy winters and warm, rainless summers, during which the heat is moderated by frequent morning coastal low clouds and fog. Annual precipitation is around 15 inches (380 mm), almost all in the winter, and all in the form of rain. The mean annual temperature is 56 to 60 °F (13 to 16 °C); freezes occur rarely. The field is mostly flat, with the elevation averaging 80-foot above sea level (24 m). Drainage is south to Calleguas Creek to Mugu Lagoon, and then to the Pacific Ocean.

== Geology ==
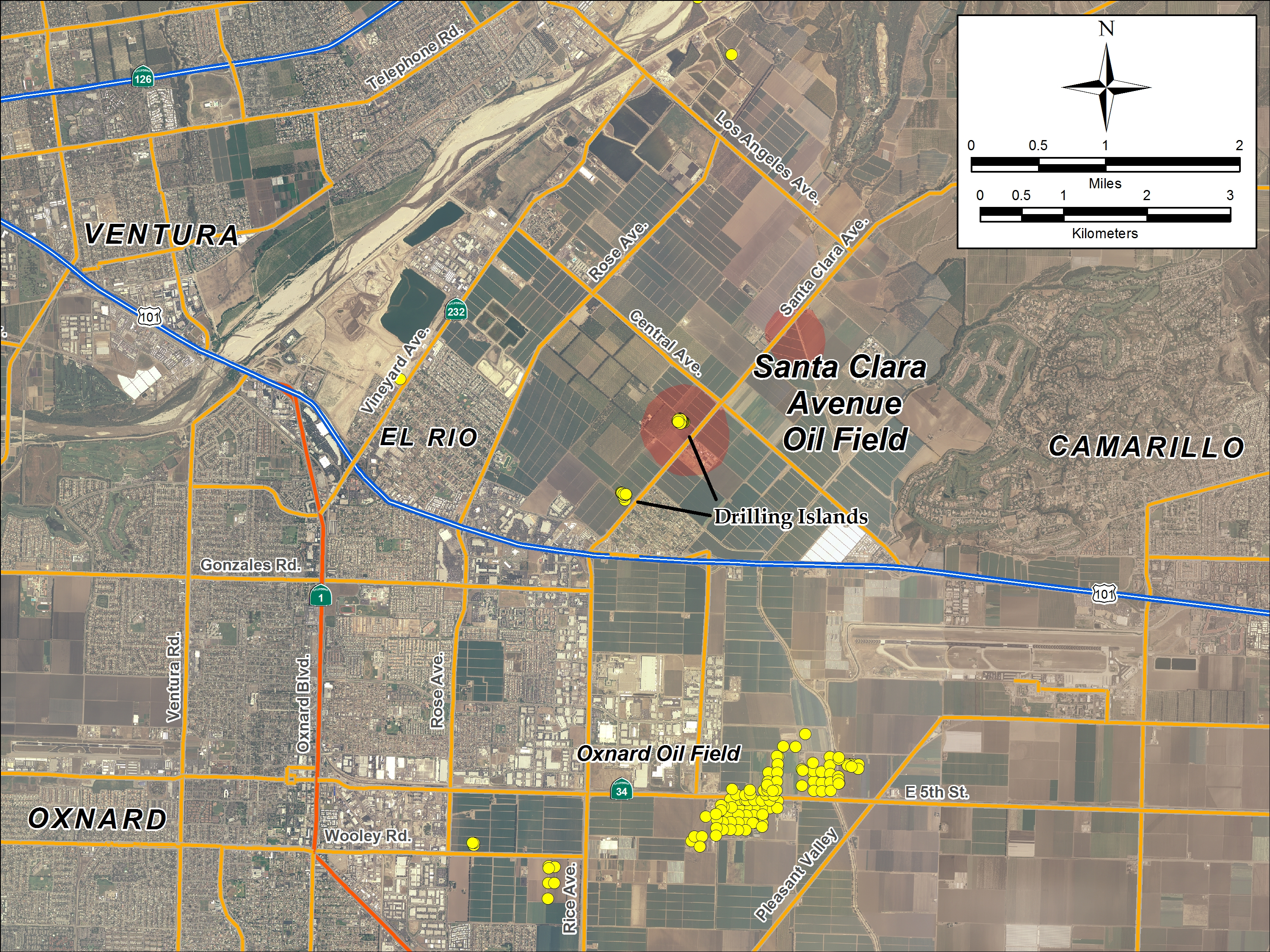
Detail of the area around the Santa Clara Avenue field, showing its location relative to Ventura, Oxnard, and Camarillo. Yellow dots represent locations of active oil wells as of 2008.

The Oxnard field is within the Ventura Basin Province of southern California. Geologically, this area is part of a structural downwarp that occurred during the late Pliocene. Deposition within the basin occurred fast enough to fill it with up to seven kilometers of sedimentary rock in only five million years. While most of the rocks filling the basin are marine sediments, some igneous rocks from the Conejo Volcanics series overlie them. Oil accumulations, which are common in the Ventura Basin, mainly occur in anticlinal settings modified by faulting. Stratigraphy is also influential in creating traps for hydrocarbons. Where the sedimentary rocks are sandstones with high porosity, and the structure and stratigraphy allow hydrocarbons to be trapped on their upward migration, oilfields are found. In the Santa Clara Avenue field, oil is trapped in numerous thin layers of oil sands within the Sespe Formation, of Oligocene age. Oil is trapped updip where it encounters the impermeable Conejo Volcanics. This igneous unit was originally thought to be a canyon fill but more recently has been interpreted to be a quickly cooling, finely crystalline intrusion.

Because the surface of the Oxnard Plain is flat, giving no hint of the subsurface structure potentially containing oil, the region was overlooked by early drillers. In spite of discoveries on all sides -- the Oxnard field to the south, the Ventura field to the northeast, and the South Mountain and Saticoy fields to the northeast -- the field was not found until 1972, by prospectors exploring the edge of the Epworth Syncline. Two productive pools were found, both in the Sespe Formation, separated by an igneous intrusion. The finds were in January 1972 and July 1973. Oil is found at great depth -- 9,000 feet in the first pool and 8,600 in the other -- and is generally medium-grade, with API gravity of 16 to 28, with a sulfur content of about two percent by weight.

== History, production, and operations ==
The discovery well for the field was drilled by McCulloch Oil Corp. in 1972. The first oil companies on the field quickly delineated its limits, finding a second productive pool a year and a half later. Oil companies active on the field during its history included Tenneco Oil Co, ARCO, Chevron, and Concordia Resources. Peak production from the field was in 1977. Venoco bought the field between 1994 and 1996, with some working interest remaining to the predecessor companies.

All drilling on the field is done from two drilling islands set back about 100 yards from Santa Clara Avenue. Oil is stored in tanks at the southernmost of the two drilling islands. As of December 31, 2011, there were 17 producing oil wells on the field. Another two wells were used for water disposal.
