= West Montalvo Oil Field =

Oil field in Ventura County, California, United States

Coordinates: 34.2146°N 119.2390°W

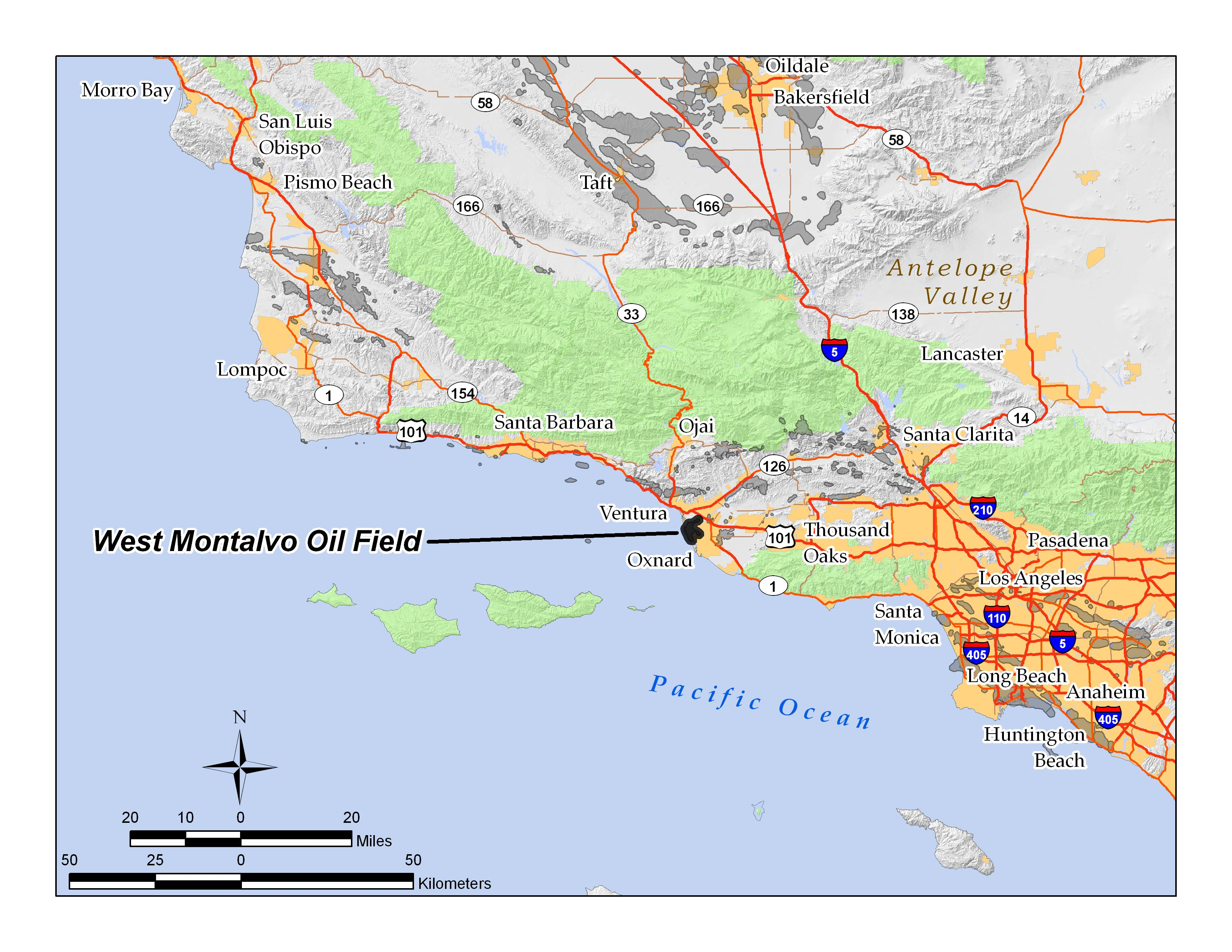
The West Montalvo Oil Field in Ventura County, California. Other oil fields are shown in dark gray.

The West Montalvo Oil Field is a large and productive oil field on the coast of Ventura County, California, in the United States, in and adjacent to the city of Oxnard, California. Discovered in 1947, it has produced approximately 50 million barrels (7,900,000 m^{3}) of oil, and originally contained up to 650 million barrels of oil in both the onshore and offshore areas. The offshore portion of the field is exploited from wells directionally drilled from onshore near McGrath Lake, from within an enclosure above the high-tide line at McGrath State Beach.

The West Montalvo field was also the first dry natural gas field of commercial value to be discovered in Ventura County; in its lifetime it has produced over 48 billion cubic feet (1.4×10^{9} m^{3}) of gas.

The field was recently acquired and is currently operated by CalNRG Operating LLC.

== Setting ==
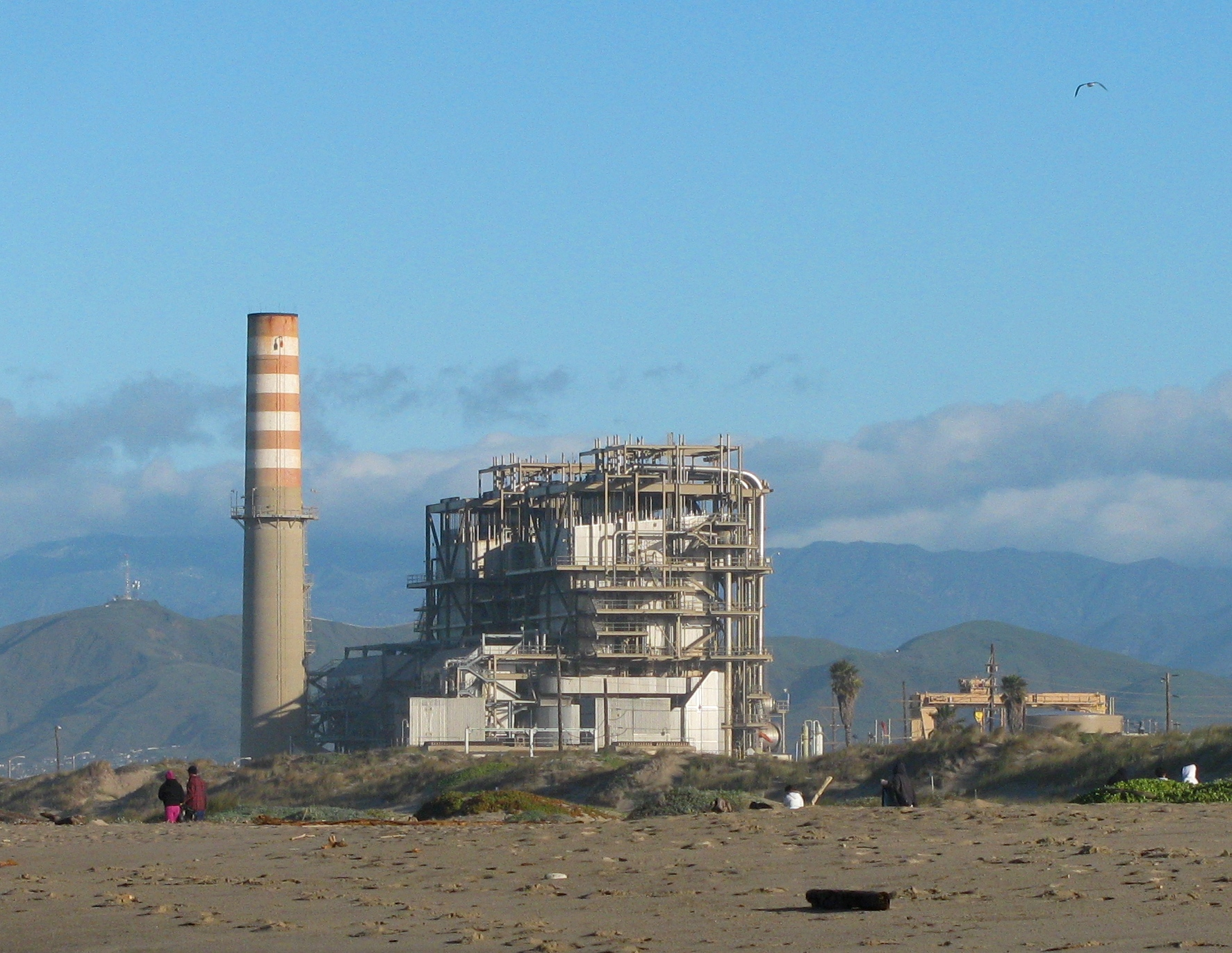
Reliant Energy's Mandalay Generating Station, on the West Montalvo Oil Field north of Mandalay Beach Park.

The oil field underlies the portion of coastline just south of the outlet of the Santa Clara River, including several state and county parks (including McGrath State Beach, Mandalay Beach Park, and Oxnard Shores Park). While parts of the oil field are within the city of Oxnard, California, most of it is within an unincorporated region east of the intersection of Harbor Boulevard and Gonzales Road, a mixed-use area of agricultural fields interspersed with oil wells and associated production and processing facilities. This area was designated a greenbelt through a joint agreement between the cities of Oxnard and Ventura. The terrain is almost all flat, save for berms and sand dunes at the shoreline. Elevations on the field range from sea level to about 40 feet (12 m) above sea level, and drainage is to the west and southwest, via a system of canals. Total productive area of the field is 780 acres (316 ha), with 200 of that being offshore.

Some oil field and power generation facilities are in enclosures within the parks and open spaces. A row of wells near McGrath Lake drill into the offshore portion of the field; visitors to McGrath State Beach can walk past them along the beach. Reliant Energy's 560-megawatt gas-fired Mandalay Generating Station is north of and adjacent to Mandalay Beach Park. An oil-gas separator adjacent to the Mandalay plant processes gas from the offshore Santa Clara and Hueneme fields and sells the gas to Reliant for use at the power plant. Mandalay Beach Park consists of 94 acres (38 ha) of land left in its natural state, without amenities, and contains habitat for the endangered snowy plover.

"McGrath 4 Well No. 1218", an oil well within Mandalay Beach Park, in a walled enclosure is allowed to remain. This oil well is one of the most productive in the entire field, producing nearly 70,000 barrels (11,000 m^{3}) of oil in 2009 alone, around 190 barrels per day (30 m^{3}/d).

The climate in the region is Mediterranean, with cool, rainy winters and warm, rainless summers, in which the heat is moderated by frequent morning coastal low clouds and fog. Annual precipitation is around 15 inches (380 mm), almost all in the winter, and all in the form of rain. The mean annual temperature is 56 to 60 degrees Fahrenheit; freezes occur rarely.

== Geology ==
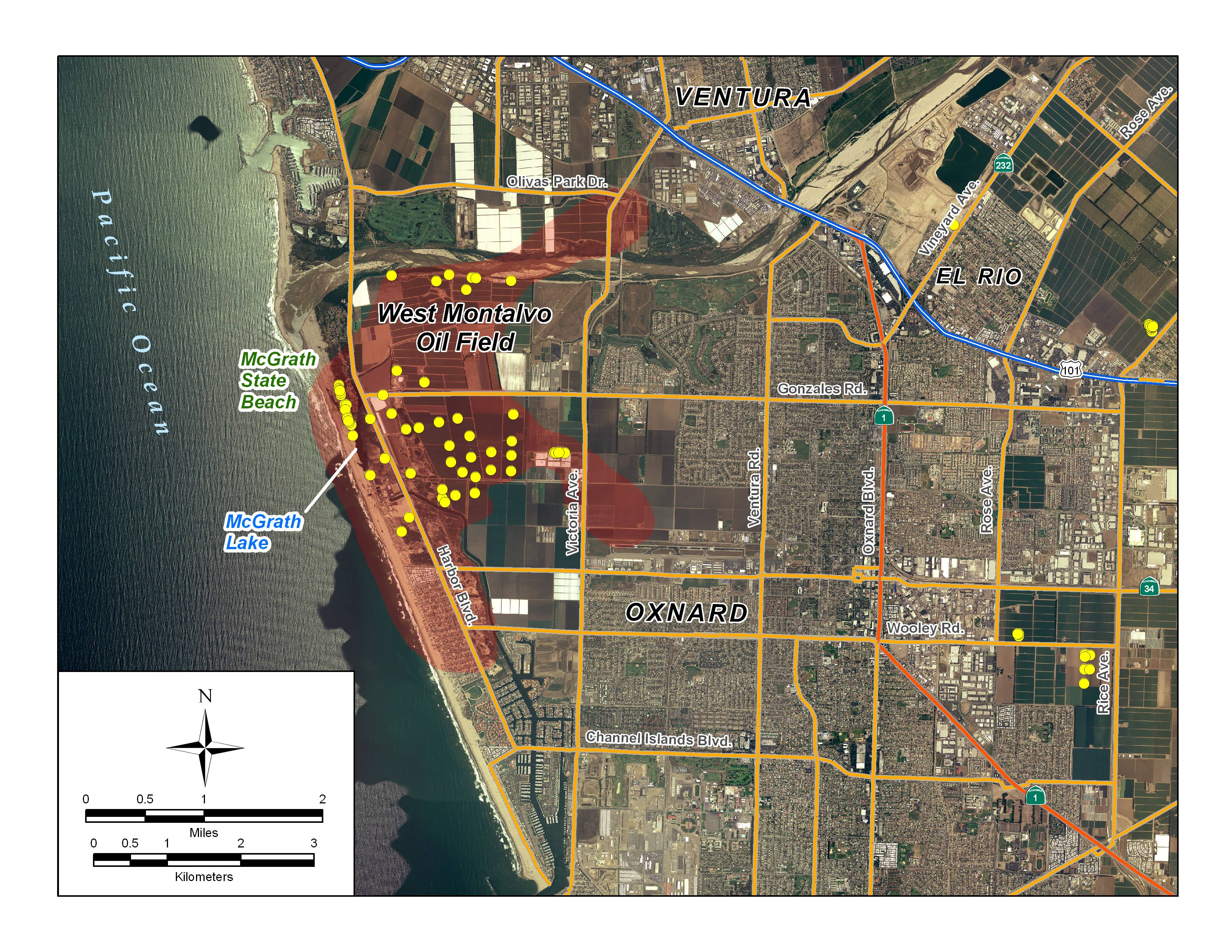
Detail of the Montalvo field, showing its location relative to Ventura, Oxnard, and other urbanized areas in the coastal region. Yellow dots represent locations of active oil wells as of 2008.

The Montalvo field is an accumulation of oil within an eastward-plunging anticline. Within the anticline, numerous Pliocene-age sand units contain petroleum of various types. These sand units pinch out, and many are lenticular, with impermeable units above and below. The anticline is bounded on the north by a branch of the Oakridge Fault, and the anticline itself is broken in many places by small faults perpendicular to the Oakridge.

Within the upper Pico Formation, many lenticular sand units contain natural gas; underneath this unit is the McGrath Zone, which was the first to be discovered, and which contains oil at an API gravity of 28. Beneath the McGrath, and separated by an unconformity, portions of the Miocene-age Santa Margarita and Monterey Formations show in drilling logs; yet another unconformity marks the top of the Colonia Zone, of Oligocene age, which contains more lenticular and pinched-out reservoirs of oil sands containing crude oil with an API gravity of around 15-18. Due to the relatively high reservoir temperature and geothermal gradient, the oil flows satisfactorily through the reservoir sands towards the production wells.

== History, production and operations ==
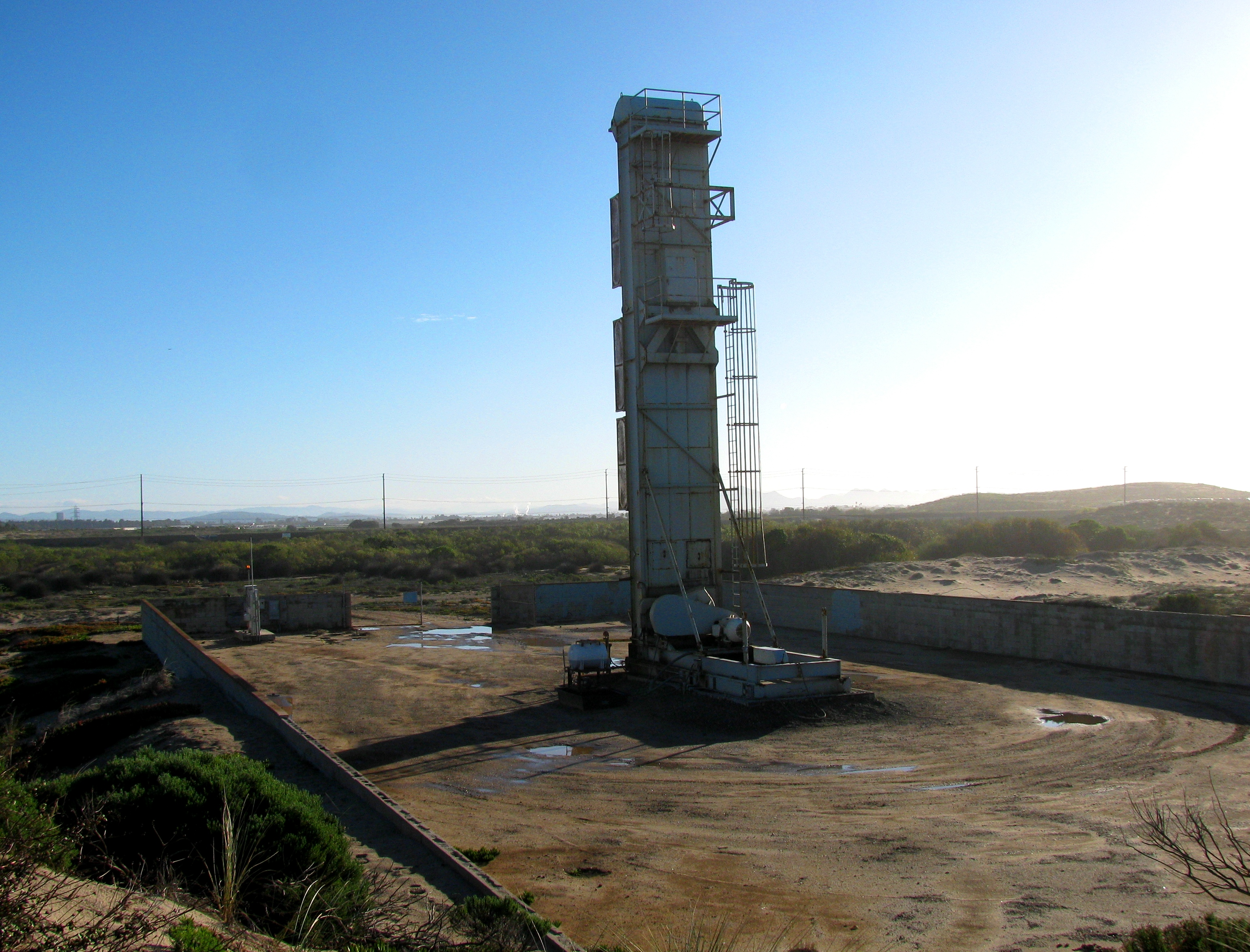
McGrath 4 Well No. 1218, within Mandalay Beach Park. This well produced nearly 70,000 barrels of oil in 2009.

Standard Oil Company of California discovered the field in April 1947 by drilling into the McGrath producing horizon. The first well produced 154 barrels per day (24.5 m^{3}/d), encouraging further exploration. In 1951, the Colonia Pool was found at 11,500 feet (3,500 m), which had a heavier oil with high sulfur content, and following the trend west, discovered the offshore portion of the field in June 1953 by drilling into the Oligocene-age Sespe Formation, where they also found oil at the 11,500-foot (3,500 m) depth. This producing horizon was also part of the Colonia Zone. This unit remains richly productive.

By the end of 2008, the field was one of the top ten in California by largest production increase of the preceding year.

=== Ownership ===
The field has changed owners several times. In 1977, Standard Oil Company of California became Chevron Corporation, and the field was run under that logo. Chevron sold the field to Bush Oil Company of Taft, California, on May 1, 1990. Bush Oil ran the field for only two years, selling it to Berry Petroleum Company in 1992.

In 2007, Venoco acquired the field from Berry Petroleum Company for $63 million; it was sold in 2014 to California Resources Corporation for $200 million. The field was acquired by CalNRG Operating LLC after the lease was reassigned in 2024.

=== Methods of improving production ===
Field operators have tried several enhanced oil recovery projects to improve production rates. In the McGrath pool, gas injection was used from 1956 to 1968, and the zone has been waterflooded since 1963, in an attempt to boost reservoir pressure. Both methods also have been used on the Colonia pool, with gas injection running from 1964 to 1971, and waterflooding since 1960. Enhanced methods have included using water injection to get more tight oil. Oil companies inject the chemical waste water, also called produced water, back into the earth. The presence of water injection wells near directionally drilled oil wells lead one investigative journalist to hypothesize that fracking had occurred.

=== Refining ===
Oil produced in the field goes to the small (2,800-barrel (450 m^{3})-per-day) Oxnard Refinery, owned by Tenby Inc., in an unincorporated area on Fifth Street near the eastern Oxnard city limit. This refinery also processes oil from the Oxnard Oil Field upon which the refinery is located. Other petroleum processing facilities nearby include one west of the intersection of Harbor Boulevard and Gonzales Road, as well as two near the Santa Clara River, east of Harbor Boulevard.

=== Spills ===
In 1991, an unknown amount of oil was spilled.

In 1994, 2 barrels of oil were spilled.
