= Saticoy Oil Field =

Oil and gas field in Ventura County, California, United States

Coordinates: 34.3088°N 119.1078°W

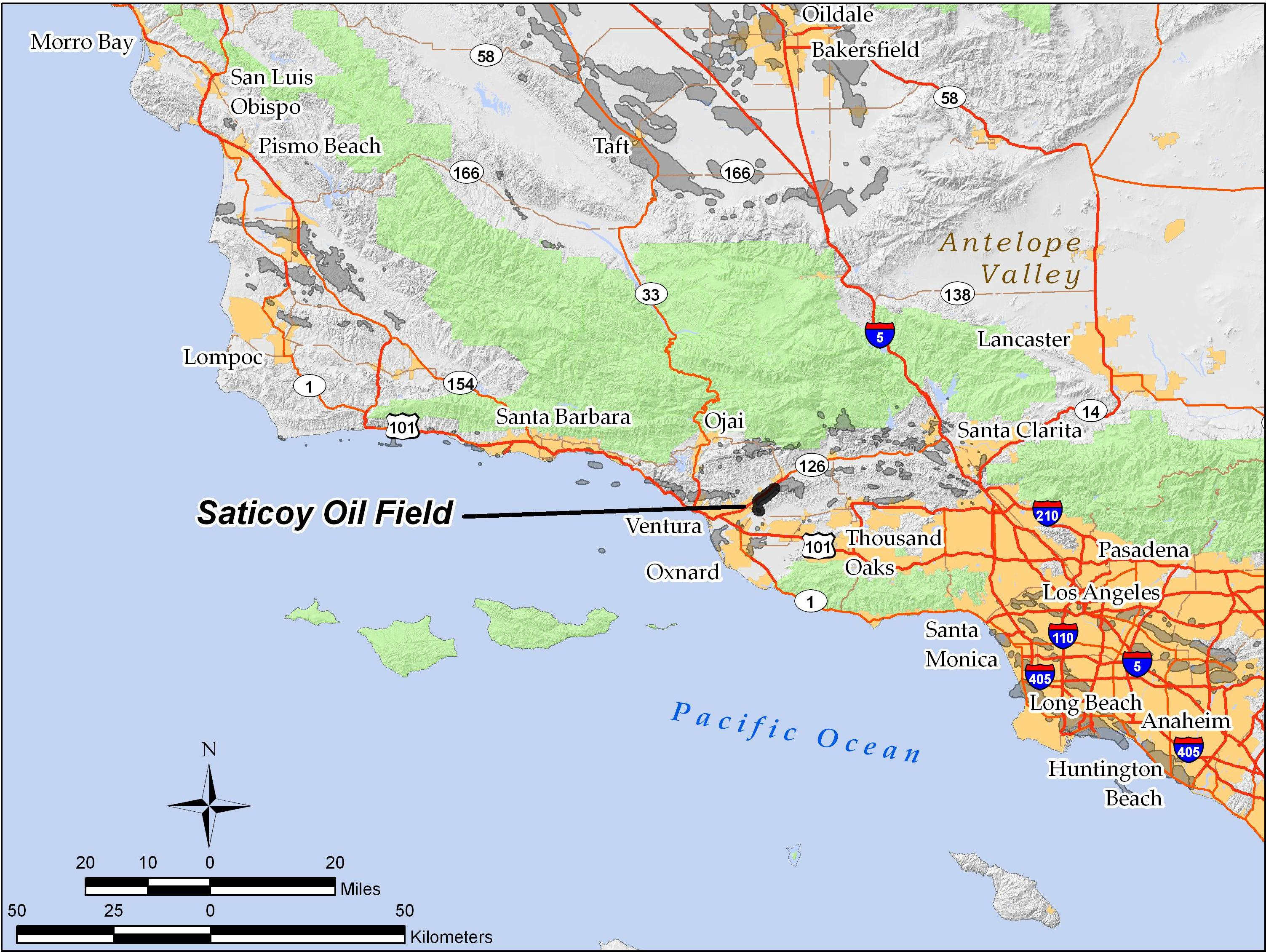
- The Saticoy Oil Field in Ventura County, California. Other oil fields are shown in dark gray.
- Country: United States
- Region: Ventura Basin Province
- Location: Ventura County, California
- Offshore/onshore: onshore
- Operator: Vintage Production

Field history
- Discovery: 1955
- Start of development: 1956
- Peak year: 1958

Production
- Current production of oil: 113.4 barrels per day (~5,651 t/a)
- Estimated oil in place: 0.387 million barrels (~52,800 t)
- Producing formations: Pleistocene Santa Barbara Formation, Upper Pliocene Pico Sand

The Saticoy Oil Field is an oil and gas field in Ventura County, California, in the United States. The field is a long narrow band paralleling the Santa Clara River near the town of Saticoy. Discovered in 1955, it is one of the smaller but productive fields found in the region after most of the large fields had already been operational for decades. At the beginning of 2009 it still contained an estimated 387,000 barrels (61,500 m^{3}) of recoverable oil out of its original 23.5 million, and had 15 wells remaining in operation. Vintage Production, a subsidiary of Occidental Petroleum, was the primary operator on the field as of 2009.

== Geographic setting ==
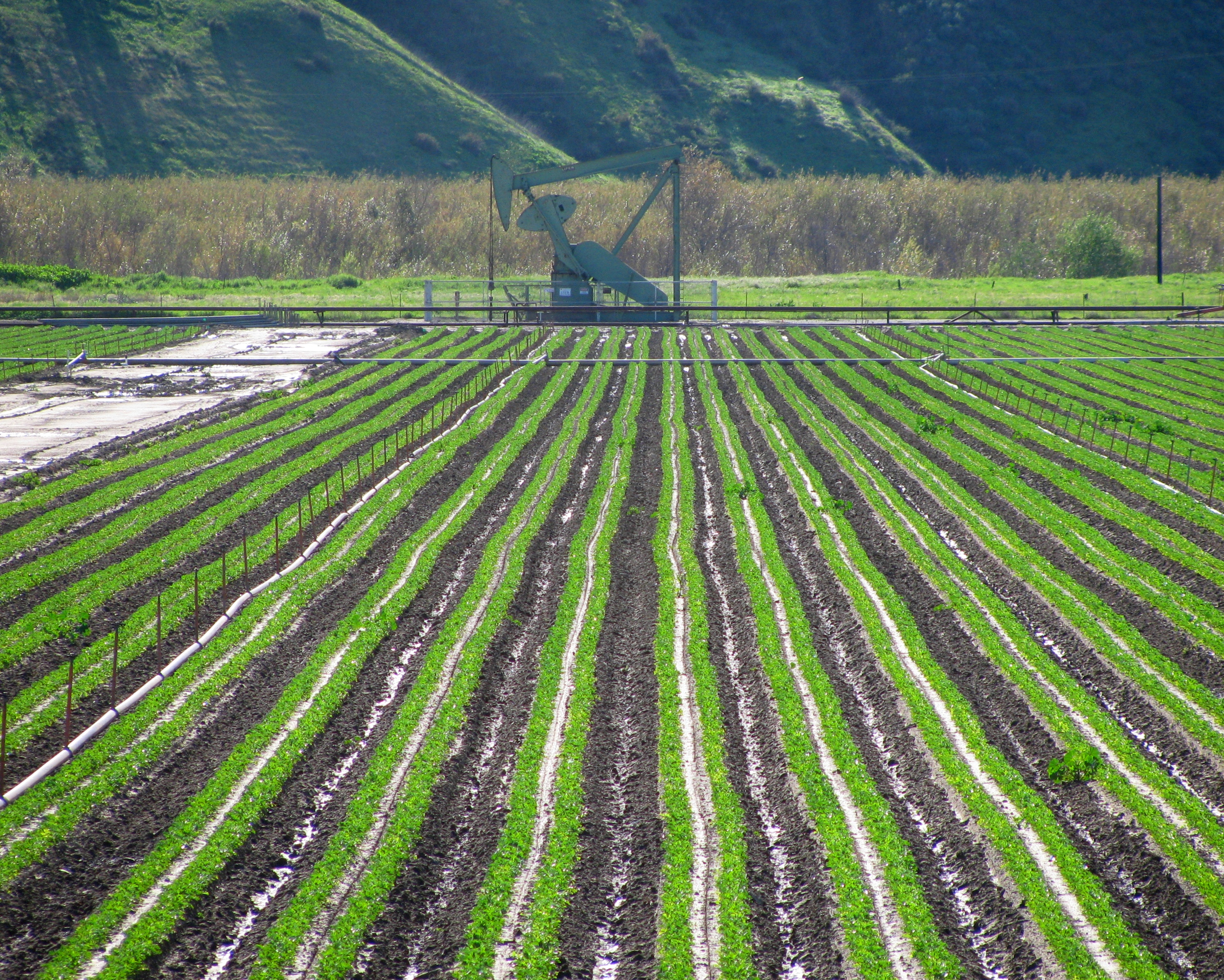
Active oil well within a working agricultural field near Saticoy. The riparian vegetation in the background is the Santa Clara River.

The field is long and narrow, exactly following the Oak Ridge Fault which also defines the alignment of the Santa Clara River, running from northeast to southwest. The field is approximately four miles long by one-quarter mile across, amounting to 640 productive acres total, mostly on the northwest side of the Santa Clara River. California State Route 126 parallels the field for its entire length, about one-half mile to the northwest. The large South Mountain Oil Field is adjacent on the northeast, and the Santa Clara Avenue and Oxnard oil fields are south of the river, on the north and south sides of U.S. Highway 101 respectively.

Land use in the vicinity of the field is predominantly agricultural, with oil wells and associated production infrastructure interspersed between working agricultural fields and orchards. Climate in the region is Mediterranean, with cool, rainy winters and warm, rainless summers, in which the heat is moderated by frequent morning coastal low clouds and fog. Annual precipitation is around 15 inches, almost all in the winter, and all in the form of rain. The mean annual temperature is 56 °F (13 °C) to 60 °F (16 °C); freezes occur rarely. Elevations on the field range from about 140 to 220 feet (43 to 67 m) above sea level. As it is in the Santa Clara River floodplain it is mostly flat, with runoff going directly into the adjacent Santa Clara River which flows west toward its outlet into the Pacific Ocean between Oxnard and Ventura.

== Geology ==
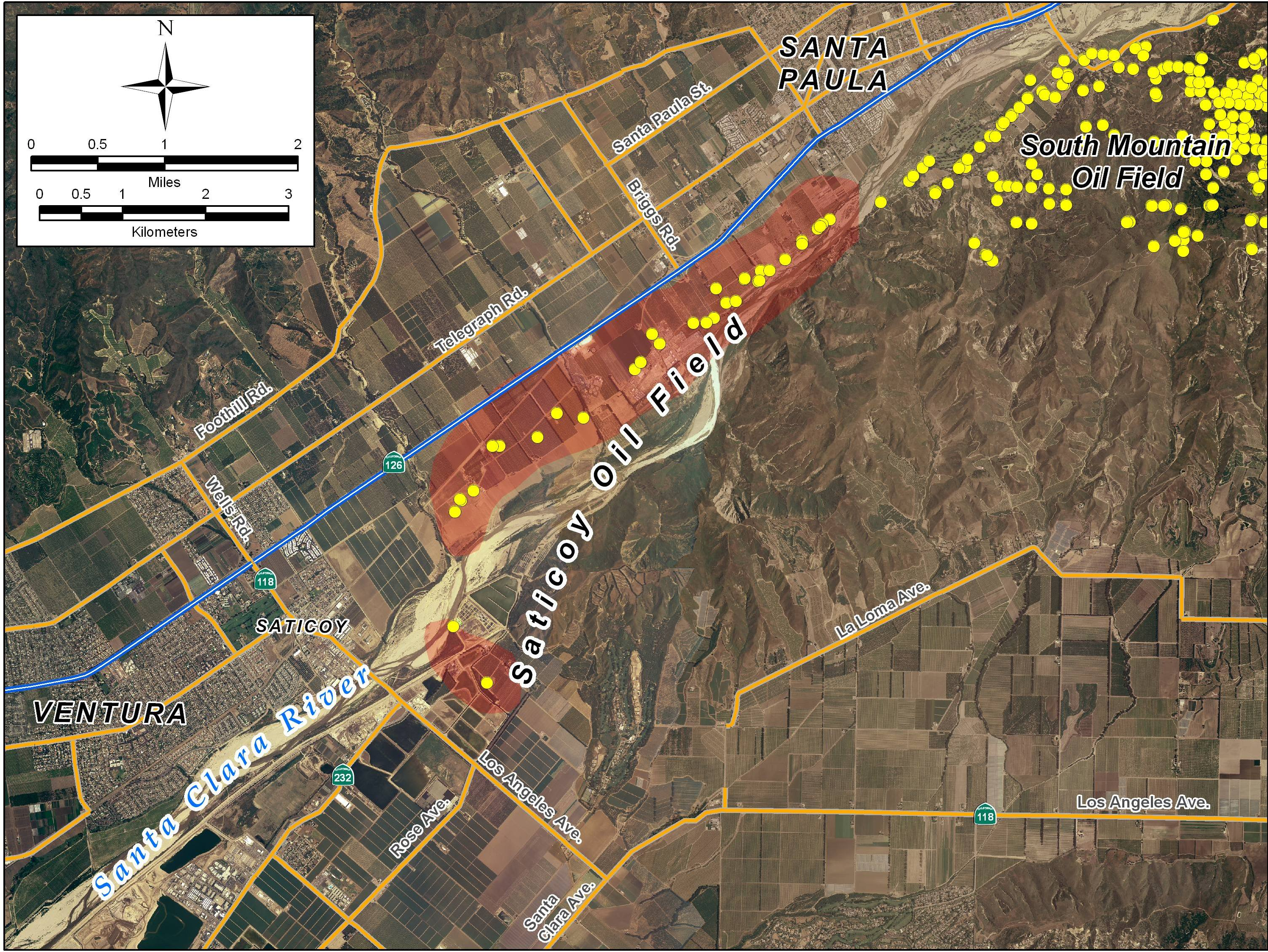
Detail of the Saticoy field, showing its location relative to Ventura, Oxnard, and other urbanized areas. Yellow dots represent locations of active oil wells as of 2008.

The Saticoy field is within the Ventura Basin Province of southern California. Geologically, this area is part of a structural downwarp that occurred during the late Pliocene. Within the Ventura Basin are some of the richest agricultural fields in California, made possible by the thick alluvial topsoil left by tens of thousands of years of floods from the area's river systems. The basin is filled with sedimentary layers, and cut through from northeast to southwest by the Oak Ridge Fault.

In the Saticoy field, oil is trapped both in pinchouts of updipping permeable sedimentary units within units of lesser permeability, and in sedimentary units which end abruptly at the Oak Ridge Thrust Fault; oil migrating upwards within permeable units, in this case, encounters an impermeable barrier of rock placed there by the fault. Horizontally, the fault defines the course of the Santa Clara River and the northern base of the hills south of the river (including South Mountain), and is part of the fault complex responsible for the 1994 Northridge earthquake. The fault bounds the field on the southeast; many of the oil-bearing units have been deformed so as to be aligned almost vertically, especially in the lower zones. The sedimentary units are predominantly turbidites, and are of Pleistocene and Pliocene age. From the top down, the units are the Pleistocene Santa Barbara Formation, which contains the producing horizon labeled the "Upper F Zone"; and the Upper Pliocene Pico Sand, which contains the horizons labeled "Lower F Zone", "G Zone", "H Zone", "I Zone", "J Zone", and "K Zone." Most of the oil is between 6,000 and 9,000 feet (1,800 and 2,700 m) below ground surface.

Oil is of medium gravity and low sulfur content throughout, varying little between the different producing horizons. API gravity varies from 30 to 36. The shallowest producing formation, the Upper F Zone, has an average depth of 6,350 feet (1,940 m) below ground surface, and the deepest, the K, has an average depth of 9,035 feet (2,754 m).

== History, production and operations ==
Shell Oil Co. drilled the discovery well for the field in May 1955, reaching a depth of 12,020 feet. Development of the Saticoy field was unusual in that the deepest producing horizons, the J and K, were the first to be discovered. All of the rest – F, G, H, and I – had been found by Shell by August 1956, and development of the field was quick after that. The field reached peak production in 1958 at 2.8 million barrels (450×10^{3} m^{3}) of oil per year.

As production began its inevitable decline, Shell commenced waterflooding operations to increase reservoir pressure and dispose of produced water. Waterflooding ran from 1963 to 1968 in the G, H, I, and J zones.

Shell held most of the field until 1984, at which time they sold it to Sage Energy. This was a period during which many of the major oil companies were divesting their operations in the onshore coastal portions of California, selling them to smaller independent operators, in order to focus on more profitable opportunities overseas. Sage held the field until 1990, at which time they sold it to Whiting Petroleum Corp; Whiting sold some active wells to Crimson Resource Management Corp. in 1994. Crimson ran the field until 2002, at which time they sold their 41 remaining wells to Bentley-Simonson, who held it until April 2005, selling to Plains Exploration & Production, who operated the declining field for slightly more than a year, selling the 14 remaining active wells to their present operator, Vintage Production, in October 2006.

As of 2010, there were 15 wells remaining on the field, 14 active and operated by Vintage. The one other, owned by Ibsen Resource Management, Inc., had been idled. The 14 Vintage wells were each producing oil at an average rate of 8.1 barrels per day (1.29 m^{3}/d).

== Bibliography ==
- California Oil and Gas Fields, Volumes I, II and III. Vol. I (1998), Vol. II (1992), Vol. III (1982). California Department of Conservation, Division of Oil, Gas, and Geothermal Resources (DOGGR). 1,472 pp. Ventura Oil Field information pp. 572–574. PDF file available on CD from www.consrv.ca.gov.
- California Department of Conservation, Oil and Gas Statistics, Annual Report, December 31, 2008.
- Keller, Margaret. Ventura Basin Province, U.S. Geological Survey Digital Data Series DDS-30, Release 2, one CD-ROM, 19 p. + supporting maps, figures, and tables. Available here
