= El Rio, California =

- Unincorporated community; Census designated place
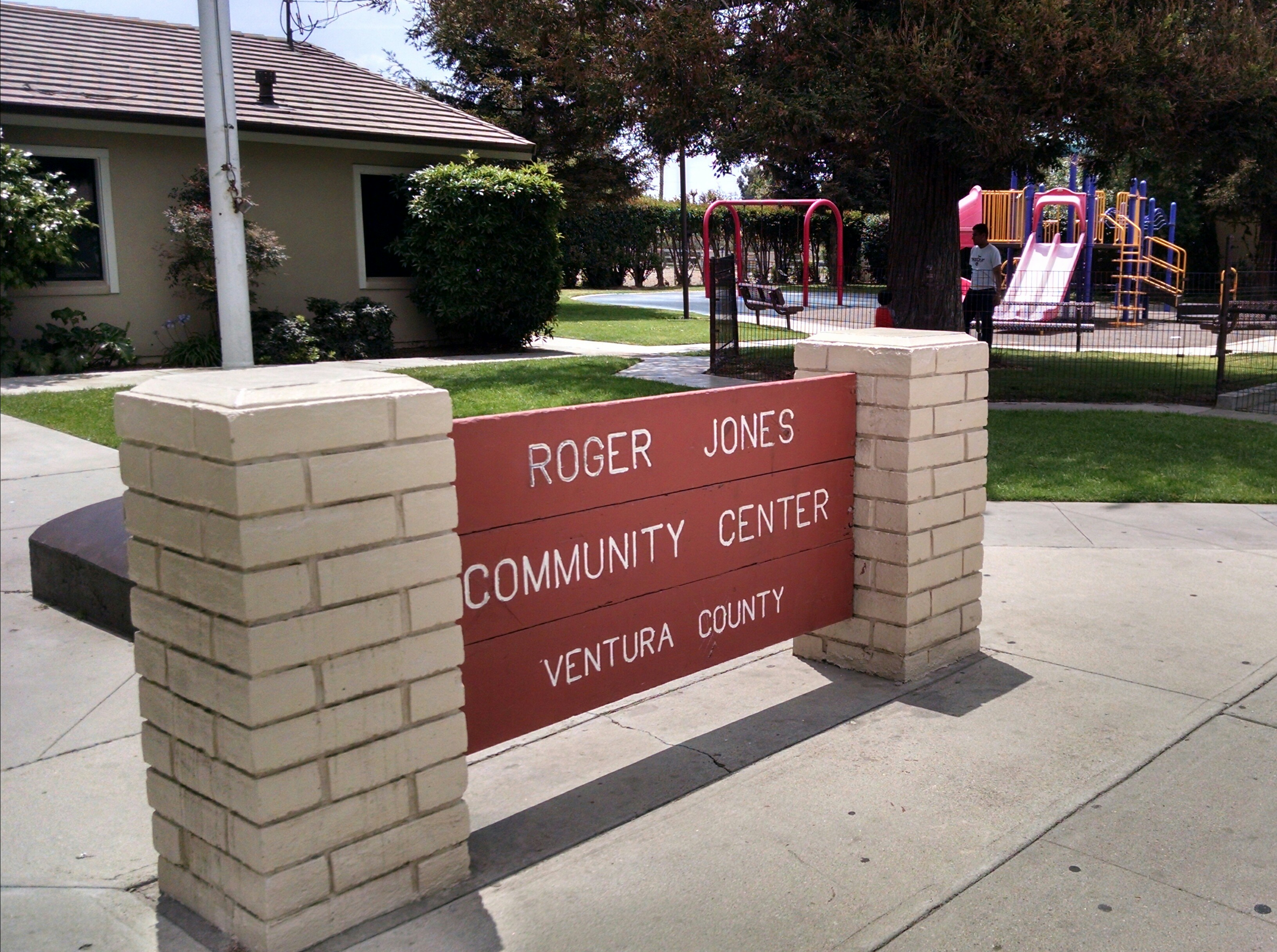
- Roger Jones Community Center

- Location in Ventura County and the state of California
- Coordinates: 34°14′21″N 119°9′32″W
- Country: United States
- State: California
- County: Ventura
- Town founded: 1875

Government
  - State Senator: Monique Limón (D)
  - CA Assembly: Steve Bennett (D)
  - U. S. Rep.: Julia Brownley (D)

Area
  - Total: 2.032 sq mi (5.263 km^{2})
  - Land: 2.032 sq mi (5.263 km^{2})
  - Water: 0 sq mi (0 km^{2}) 0%
- Elevation: 92 ft (28 m)

Population (2020)
  - Total: 7,037
  - Density: 3,463/sq mi (1,337/km^{2})
- Time zone: UTC-8 (Pacific)
  - Summer (DST): UTC-7 (PDT)
- ZIP code: 93036 (Oxnard P.O.)
- Area code: 805
- FIPS code: 06-22370
- GNIS feature IDs: 1652703, 2408061

El Rio (/ɛl ˈriːoʊ/; Spanish: El Río, meaning "The River") is a small, rural unincorporated town in Ventura County, California, United States, on the northeast side of the 101 Freeway and Oxnard, and south of the Santa Clara River. The town was founded in 1875 and named New Jerusalem by the owner of general store who became the first postmaster in 1882. In 1885, a school and Santa Clara Catholic Church were built. Located near where the coastal railroad line crosses the Santa Clara River, the town's name was changed to El Rio around 1900. The former wagon river crossing route became the Ventura Freeway which separates the community from the commercial developments that grew up on the southwest side of the freeway. That portion of the historic community and sections closer to the river have been annexed to the city of Oxnard. Vineyard Avenue (State Route 232) is the central business district for the largely residential community.

The population was 7,037 at the 2020 census, down from 7,198 at the 2010 census. For statistical purposes, the United States Census Bureau has defined a portion of the unincorporated area as El Rio census-designated place (CDP) which does not precisely correspond to the historical community that is much larger with significant portions having been annexed to the city of Oxnard.

== Etymology ==
El Rio was first named New Jerusalem by Simon Cohn in 1875. The post office later changed its name to El Rio in 1895, which is the Spanish translation for “the river”.

== History ==
Early inhabitants of the area were the Chumash, a Native American tribe who continue to inhabit the area. The Chumash region extends from Point Conception to Santa Monica and back into the foothills as far as the Coast Range. One of their largest settlements was at nearby Saticoy, because of the bubbling springs that were found there.

On May 6, 1837, Juan M. Sanchez (1791–1873), a former Santa Barbara Presidio soldier, was granted the Rancho Santa Clara del Norte, which contained 13,989 acres (57 km^{2}) of land extending from the Santa Clara River south to the northern boundary of present-day Camarillo, and from the present day 101 Freeway east to the west end of South Mountain. Sanchez and his wife, Ines Guevara de Sanchez (1794–1862), had their adobe home built below the western slope of South Mountain, within a heavy group of eucalyptus trees at the east end of present-day Rose Avenue, an avenue that was lined on both sides with tall eucalyptus trees.

The town was founded in 1875 and named New Jerusalem, California, by Simon Cohn (1852–1936), a Prussian Jewish merchant who built a general store at the location. The U.S. Post Office Department established New Jerusalem Post Office on July 26, 1882, and Cohn was appointed the first postmaster. The first one-room schoolhouse was opened in 1885. Santa Clara Catholic Church was founded the same year though services has been conducted since 1877. It was the first Catholic church to be built in Ventura County since the founding of Mission San Buenaventura 95 years earlier.

Octaviano and Rosaria Moraga were early settlers who first came to county in the 1870s from Sonora, Mexico. Octaviano worked as the barkeeper at the New Parian Hotel in Ventura, and ran a boarding house they owned in Ventura. They eventually were able to buy land in New Jerusalem where Octaviano ran a livery stable. He also drove a two-horse stage between Port Hueneme and the Montalvo train station. His descendants were part of the El Rio community up into the 21st century.

On February 14, 1895, the postal authority changed the name of the town to Jerusalem. Four months later, they changed it to Elrio (one word.) In 1905, they changed it to El Rio, two words, which means in Spanish "The River," referring to the nearby Santa Clara or to El Rio de Santa Clara o La Colonia. The town was at a crossroads on the boundary of two ranchos (El Rio de Santa Clara o La Colonia and Rancho Santa Clara del Norte).

The El Rio Post Office was discontinued on October 31, 1911. It was reestablished in 1953. Until Rio Mesa High School was built on Central Avenue northeast of El Rio and opened in 1965, El Rio students were bused to Oxnard High School and later to Camarillo High School in Camarillo. The post office was discontinued again in 1966. In 1954, developer Samuel Oschin purchased 125 acres of the former Simon Cohn estate and developed Rio Plaza, a subdivision with more than 500 homes.

== Geography ==
According to the United States Census Bureau, the census-designated place (CDP) has a total area of 2.0 square miles (5.2 km^{2}), all land.

To the east and southeast of town, within the adjoining agricultural area, is the Santa Clara Avenue Oil Field.

It has an average elevation of 80 feet.

== Demographics ==
Historical population
Census	Pop.	Note	%±
1950	1,376		—
1960	6,966		406.3%
1970	6,173		−11.4%
1980	5,674		−8.1%
1990	6,419		13.1%
2000	6,193		−3.5%
2010	7,198		16.2%
2020	7,037		−2.2%
U.S. Decennial Census; 1850–1870 1880-1890; 1900 1910 1920; 1930 1940 1950; 1960 1970 1980; 1990 2000 2010

El Rio first appeared as an unincorporated place in the 1950 U.S. census; and then as a census designated place in the 1980 U.S. census.

El Rio has the highest percentage of manufacturing workers in Ventura County: 34% of residents have jobs within the manufacturing industries.

=== 2020 census ===
As of the 2020 census, El Rio had a population of 7,037. The population density was 3,463.1 inhabitants per square mile (1,337.1/km^{2}). The median age was 32.7 years. 28.0% of residents were under the age of 18, 10.4% were aged 18 to 24, 27.5% were aged 25 to 44, 22.2% were aged 45 to 64, and 11.7% were 65 years of age or older. For every 100 females there were 105.5 males, and for every 100 females age 18 and over there were 101.8 males age 18 and over.

The census reported that 99.2% of the population lived in households, 0.3% lived in non-institutionalized group quarters, and 0.5% were institutionalized. 100.0% of residents lived in urban areas, while 0.0% lived in rural areas.

There were 1,583 households in El Rio, of which 48.1% had children under the age of 18 living in them. Of all households, 56.2% were married-couple households, 6.0% were cohabiting couple households, 16.1% were households with a male householder and no spouse or partner present, and 21.7% were households with a female householder and no spouse or partner present. About 13.4% of all households were made up of individuals and 5.2% had someone living alone who was 65 years of age or older. The average household size was 4.41. There were 1,274 families (80.5% of all households).

There were 1,632 housing units at an average density of 803.1 units per square mile (310.1 units/km^{2}), of which 1,583 (97.0%) were occupied. Of occupied units, 58.2% were owner-occupied and 41.8% were occupied by renters. The vacancy rate was 3.0%, including a homeowner vacancy rate of 0.4% and a rental vacancy rate of 1.5%.

Racial composition as of the 2020 census
Race	Number	Percent
White	1,566	22.3%
Black or African American	64	0.9%
American Indian and Alaska Native	288	4.1%
Asian	79	1.1%
Native Hawaiian and Other Pacific Islander	21	0.3%
Some other race	2,945	41.9%
Two or more races	2,074	29.5%
Hispanic or Latino (of any race)	6,249	88.8%

=== Income and poverty ===
In 2023, the US Census Bureau estimated that the median household income was $83,233, and the per capita income was $30,101. About 21.8% of families and 22.0% of the population were below the poverty line.

=== 2010 census ===
The 2010 United States census reported that El Rio had a population of 7,198. The population density was 3,556.5 inhabitants per square mile (1,373.2/km^{2}). The racial makeup of El Rio was 3,495 (48.6%) White, 58 (0.8%) African American, 201 (2.8%) Native American, 73 (1.0%) Asian, 24 (0.3%) Pacific Islander, 3,027 (42.1%) from other races, and 320 (4.4%) from two or more races. Hispanic or Latino of any race were 6,188 persons (86.0%).

The Census reported that 7,190 people (99.9% of the population) lived in households, 8 (0.1%) lived in non-institutionalized group quarters, and 0 (0%) were institutionalized.

There were 1,629 households, out of which 904 (55.5%) had children under the age of 18 living in them, 940 (57.7%) were opposite-sex married couples living together, 284 (17.4%) had a female householder with no husband present, 164 (10.1%) had a male householder with no wife present. There were 102 (6.3%) unmarried opposite-sex partnerships, and 14 (0.9%) same-sex married couples or partnerships. 181 households (11.1%) were made up of individuals, and 79 (4.8%) had someone living alone who was 65 years of age or older. The average household size was 4.41. There were 1,388 families (85.2% of all households); the average family size was 4.47.

The population was spread out, with 2,157 people (30.0%) under the age of 18, 930 people (12.9%) aged 18 to 24, 2,028 people (28.2%) aged 25 to 44, 1,421 people (19.7%) aged 45 to 64, and 662 people (9.2%) who were 65 years of age or older. The median age was 29.6 years. For every 100 females, there were 106.9 males. For every 100 females age 18 and over, there were 106.0 males.

There were 1,700 housing units at an average density of 840.0 per square mile (324.3/km^{2}), of which 981 (60.2%) were owner-occupied, and 648 (39.8%) were occupied by renters. The homeowner vacancy rate was 1.4%; the rental vacancy rate was 2.8%. 4,223 people (58.7% of the population) lived in owner-occupied housing units and 2,967 people (41.2%) lived in rental housing units.

== Arts and culture ==
The Albert H. Soliz Library in the community is a branch of the Ventura County Library system. Poet and novelist Michele Serros a book-signing event here in 2006 when her young-adult novel “Honey Blonde Chica” was published. She remarked "This library was my home away from home when I was growing up." The Roger Jones Community Center is nearby with an adjoining public park.

== Infrastructure ==
A majority of the streets in the older unincorporated area do not have sidewalks. As traffic has increased, the safety of school children and other pedestrians has been a concern for the community. Cloverdale Mutual Water District serves 135 households in the community which is about 500 residents. In the 1990s, the area's existing septic tanks were banned because of groundwater contamination in this area of the Oxnard Plain adjacent to the Santa Clara River. A $35 million conversion to a sewer system was undertaken by the county. The area storm water drains into the adjacent Santa Clara River.

Ventura County juvenile justice center is located on the outskirts of El Rio near the small community of Strickland and Rio Mesa High School. The high-security facility on Vineyard Avenue is colloquially known as juvenile hall.
