= Rancho El Rio de Santa Clara o la Colonia =

Mexican land grant in Ventura County, California

Coordinates: 34.190°N 119.190°W

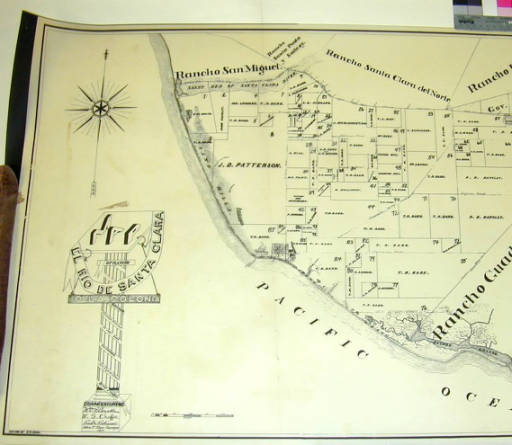
Map of the Rancho El Rio de Santa Clara o la Colonia

Rancho El Rio de Santa Clara o la Colonia was a 44,883-acre (181.64 km^{2}) Mexican land grant in present-day Ventura County, California, given in 1837 by Governor Juan B. Alvarado to seven people. The grant extended from the Santa Clara River south to the present-day Point Mugu Naval Air Station, and the boundary of Rancho Guadalasca, and east from the Pacific Ocean to the present-day 101 Freeway, and the boundary of Rancho Santa Clara del Norte. The grant encompassed much of the Oxnard Plain.

== History ==
The grant was made to seven former Presidio of Santa Barbara soldiers: Valentine Cota, Salvador Valenzuela, Vicente Pico, Rafael Valdez, Vincent Feliz, Leandro Gonzales, and Rafael Gonzales. Valentine Cota, the corporal of the guard at Mission Santa Inés. Jose Vicente Pico (1797–1863) married Maria Estefana Bruno Garcia in 1822. Rafael Gonzales built the Rafael Gonzalez House and was later alcalde of Santa Barbara.

With the cession of California to the United States following the Mexican-American War, the 1848 Treaty of Guadalupe Hidalgo provided that the land grants would be honored. As required by the Land Act of 1851, a claim for Rancho El Rio de Santa Clara o la Colonia was filed with the Public Land Commission in 1852, and the grant was patented to Valenta Cota et al. in 1872.

In the 1860s, Thomas R. Bard agent for Thomas Alexander Scott and his Philadelphia and California Petroleum Company, bought a five sevenths undivided share of El Rio de Santa Clara o la Colonia. The Gonzales family refused to sell other two sevenths share to Bard and instead sold to the Camarillo family.

== See also ==
- List of California Ranchos
- Ranchos of Ventura County, California
