= Santa Clara Waste Water explosion =

2014 industrial incident near Santa Paula, California, U.S.

A vacuum truck exploded at the Santa Clara Waste Water plant on November 18, 2014, near Santa Paula, California, United States. Two workers were injured in the initial explosion with three responding fire-fighters also being injured. The rear of the truck exploded, spreading a white liquid that spontaneously combusted as it dried and was sensitive to shock, pressure and the application of water or oxygen. A three-mile-long plume of toxic smoke (4.8 km) closed a local highway and caused local residents and businesses to be evacuated.

== Background ==
The site is located in a 91-acre industrial area (37 ha) that is surrounded by agriculture and located about 2 miles (3.2 km) southwest of the Santa Paula city limits. The facility at 815 Mission Rock Road, Santa Paula, provided service to over 30,000 waste generators. At the time, it had received and processed over 2,000,000,000 US gallons (7.6×10^{9} L) since it opened in 1959. The capacity of the facility was increased to handle up to 100-US-gallon-per-minute (380 L; 83 imp gal) or 140,000-US-gallon-per-day (530,000 L) by 2014. The facility provides an environmentally safe and legal means of treating, disposing and recycling of contaminated but non-hazardous waste as an alternative to dumping untreated wastes into municipal sewer systems or into the environment. The plant used centrifuges, electrocoagulation, carbon and micron filtration, ozone injection, dissolved air flotation, and chemical treatments. Treated waste water was sent through a pipeline to the Oxnard municipal treatment plant.

A consortium of six major oil companies (Chevron, Exxon, Mobil, Shell, Texaco and Unocal) established Santa Clara Waste Water to service their internal disposal needs. Eventually the site became a full-service disposal facility for most non-hazardous wastewater and was renamed Southern California Waste Water. Green Compass operates the facility and also operates a Class II injection well in Kern County that is tailored toward oilfield production and completion fluids.

== Explosion ==
A vacuum truck exploded at the Santa Clara Waste Water plant in the early morning hours of November 18, 2014. Two workers were injured in the initial explosion, three responding fire-fighters were injured by the fumes from the spill of a highly volatile chemical mixture, and 50 others were exposed to fumes and required treatment at local hospitals. The driver was transporting waste from a temporary storage drum to a processing center when he stopped to take a meal break. The rear of the truck exploded, spreading a white liquid over a 300-by-400-foot area (91 by 122 m) that spontaneously combusted as it dried and was sensitive to shock, pressure and the application of water or oxygen. The tires of the first fire truck on the scene and the boots of three firefighters sparked small explosions when they drove and walked over the substance as they went to help the injured workers. A total of 46 people were treated for symptoms including burning eyes and upper respiratory issues. The incident evolved into a disaster when later in the morning additional materials began to burn and explode, which resulted in a three-mile-long plume of toxic smoke (4.8 km) and the closing of State Route 126. Chemical smoke drifted over the area and nearby residents and businesses were required to evacuate with those farther away being told to shelter-in-place.

== Cause ==
What was initially reported as sewage was found to be about 1,000 US gallons (3,800 L; 830 imp gal) of a chemical mixture consisting of some sort of organic peroxide. In the first days of the investigation, officials speculated that two inert chemicals accidentally mixed in the truck and created an organic peroxide substance with sulfuric acid appearing to be part of the mix. Organic peroxide combines unstably bound oxygen together with hydrogen and carbon in the same molecule and ignites easily and then burns rapidly and intensely. While field testing was performed on the reactive material for initial identification, the county hazardous materials manager found that laboratories would not test the chemicals over concerns that lab personnel could be injured or their equipment damaged. Three weeks after the incident, the substance was still highly susceptible to friction and seemed to react to something as slight as wind. Sodium chlorite was identified in an internal investigation by the firm in the months following the disaster. They claimed that the chemical was being using as a water treatment agent for the first time and was stored in the same type of storage container as wastewater. The company said they treat about 100 different streams of waste. The owner of facility said that they never had a major problem such as this since the plant only takes non-hazardous waste. The worker combined the chemical with wastewater in the vacuum truck where the chemical interacting with organic material caused an explosion that blew off the back of the truck. A former county district attorney, retained by a company attorney, issued a report in March 2015 that provided an explanation of events indicating that the worker may have accidentally combined the chemicals. Later, investigators found that an inspection by a Defense Logistics Agency contractor was scheduled for that morning and officials of the firm had directed the transfer of these hazardous materials to another location.

== Aftermath ==
Although the explosion and resulting fumes caused injuries including the lungs of three fire-fighters who remained off-duty indefinitely, the material scattered around the site was found to be non-hazardous for clean-up purposes. The two fire engines that arrived first were scrapped due to the damage. The Ventura County Sheriff declared a local emergency so the Ventura County Board of Supervisors could ratify the action and allow the county to seek reimbursement for its costs from state disaster relief funds. The only other commercial facility for disposal of oil field waste in the county, operated by Anterra Corp. in Oxnard, temporarily expanded operations after the incident. The U.S. Environmental Protection Agency oversaw the decontamination of the site. The material was neutralized and solidified on site. Tons of material were eventually taken to the Chiquita Canyon Landfill in nearby Castaic. Almost three months later on February 10, 2015, the County Supervisors ended the emergency declaration.

On August 7, 2015, a Ventura County grand jury indicted the Santa Clara Waste Water Co., the affiliated Green Compass and nine company executives and managers. Following the indictment, the district attorney had the nine defendants arrested on suspicion of several felonies and misdemeanors, including filing a false or forged instrument, dissuading a witness from reporting a crime, known failure to warn of serious concealed danger, withholding information regarding a substantial danger to public safety, conspiracy to commit a crime, causing impairment of an employee's body, and disposal of hazardous waste. The individuals pleaded guilty or no contest. The two corporate entities reached an agreement in June 2019 after they had already paid about $800,000 in restitution.

With the permit to operate suspended, the firm needed to finish removing the waste materials and provide a plan that would show how another such incident would be prevented before being allowed to start accepting liquid waste again. County regulators and county supervisors also wanted the city of Oxnard to agree to accept the waste water again after an analysis of the safety of the pipeline. In 2024, the planning director requested that the board of supervisors consider a permanent revocation of the permit. A new owner, who acquired the property out of bankruptcy, planned to redevelopment the property in a way that did require the existing special use permit.
