= McGrath State Beach =

State beach in Ventura County, California, United States

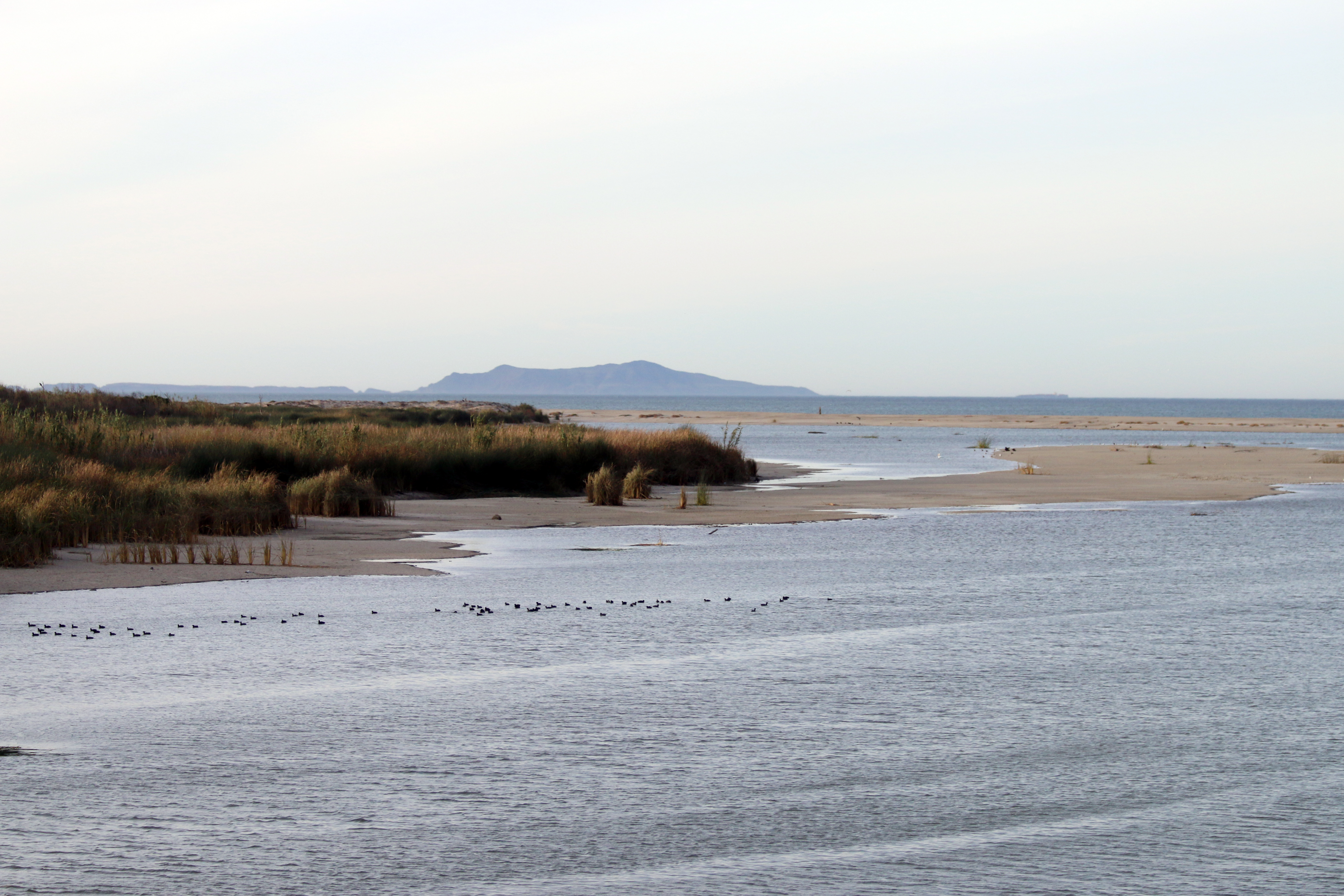
- Santa Clara River estuary at McGrath State Beach

- Location within California Location within the United States
- Location: Ventura County, California, United States
- Nearest city: Oxnard, California
- Coordinates: 34°13′30″N 119°15′30″W
- Area: 312 acres (126 ha)
- Established: 1948; 78 years ago
- Governing body: California Department of Parks and Recreation

McGrath State Beach is a protected beach park located on the south bank of the mouth of Santa Clara River in the city of Oxnard, California. McGrath State Beach is one of the best bird-watching areas in California, with the lush riverbanks of the Santa Clara River and sand dunes along the shore. A nature trail leads to the Santa Clara Estuary Natural Preserve. Camping sites are available. Two miles of beach provide surfing and fishing opportunities. Just south of the station is the undeveloped Mandalay Beach Park which is about a mile downcoast beach walk from the park or a bike ride along Harbor Blvd. Located south of Ventura on Harbor Boulevard, the beach is on the Pacific Coast Bicycle Route and the California Coastal Trail.

The park overlies the productive West Montalvo Oil Field and oil wells are in an enclosure just behind the beach, and slant-drill into the offshore part of the field. A bit farther downcoast is the Mandalay Generating Station – the stack is easily visible from the beach – owned by Reliant Energy.

The park often closes in winter but a lack of funding to repair the infrastructure, specifically a rusting sewage pipe, closed the park in 2011 until repairs could be made. Flooding has been a continuing problem. The water level in the estuary rises when the winter rains fail to breach the sand bar at the mouth of the river. When campgrounds and necessary facilities flood, the park closes until conditions change. The beach and McGrath Lake are available during the closures but access is limited to walking from an adjacent area. Surfers Knoll Park on the beach on the north side of Ventura Harbor can be used to access by walking south across the sand bar at the mouth of Santa Clara River.

A study in 2015 outlined the benefits to moving the campground within the park to higher ground.

== See also ==
- List of beaches in California
- List of California state parks
