= Rancho Santa Clara del Norte =

Mexican land grant in Ventura County, California

Coordinates: 34.280°N 119.120°W

Rancho Santa Clara del Norte was a 13,989-acre (56.61 km^{2}) Mexican land grant on the Oxnard Plain in present-day Ventura County, California. It was granted in 1837 by Governor Juan B. Alvarado to Juan María Sánchez.

The grant extended along the south bank of the Santa Clara River, east of present-day Oxnard and encompasses El Rio. Today. the main ranch house (1860) of what remains of Rancho Santa Clara del Norte is located near the Saticoy Golf Club at the intersection of the 118 highway and Rose Street. The home and ranch are owned and administered by the Lloyd-Butler family.

== History ==
Juan María Sánchez (1791–1873), son of José Tadeo Sánchez, was a former Presidio of Santa Barbara soldier. He married María Ynes Josefa Guevara (1794–1862).

With the cession of California to the United States following the Mexican-American War, the 1848 Treaty of Guadalupe Hidalgo provided that the land grants would be honored. As required by the Land Act of 1851, a claim for Rancho Santa Clara del Norte was filed with the Public Land Commission in 1852, and the grant was patented to Juan María Sánchez in 1869.

Following the droughts in 1864, Sánchez sold Rancho Santa Clara del Norte to the Schiappa Pietra brothers, natives of Italy. Antonio Schiappa Pietra (1832–1895) came to California in 1853, and opened a general merchandise store in Ventura in 1857. He was joined by his brothers, Frederico Schiappa Pietra and Leopoldo Schiappa Pietra.

In 1902, Leopoldo sold the rancho to California Farm and Fruit Company of Manchester.

== Historic sites of the Rancho ==
- Sanchez Adobe —adobe residence built in 1838 by Juan Maria Sanchez, with a second story added in 1900.

== See also ==
- List of California Ranchos
- Ranchos of Ventura County, California
