= Mandalay State Beach =

State park in California, United States

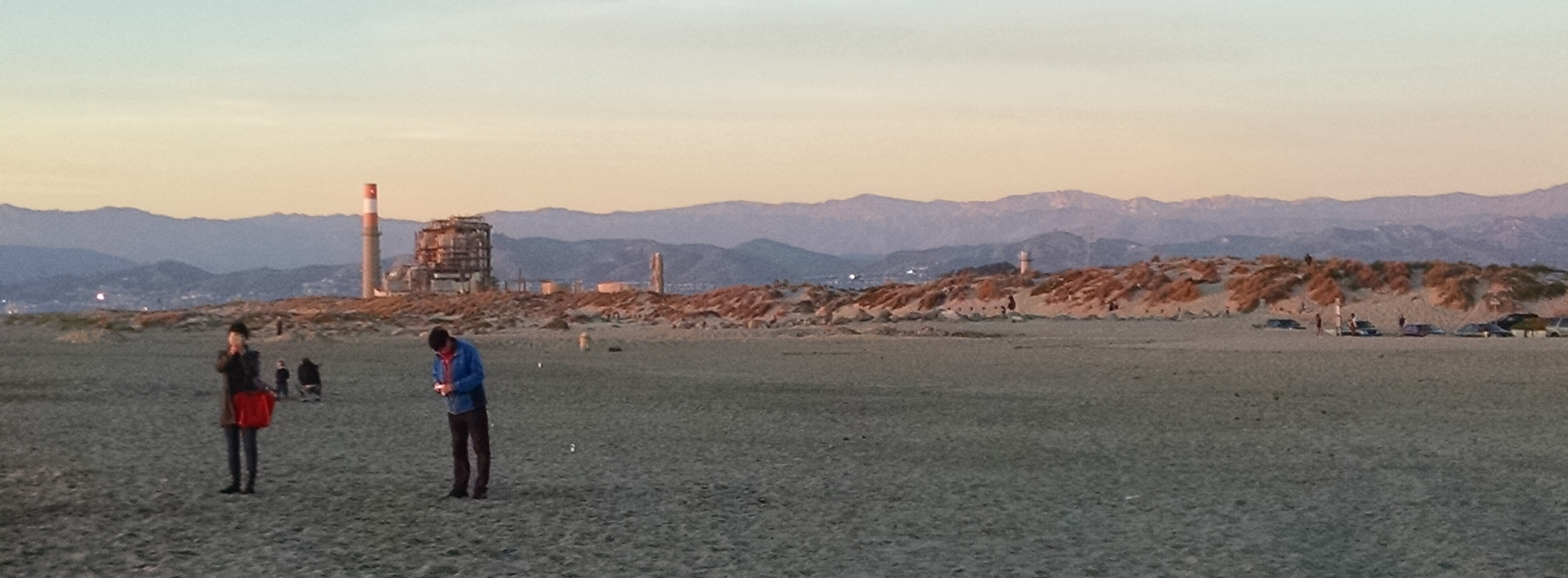
- View of Mandalay Beach, looking towards Reliant Energy power station and mountains above the City of Ventura in the background

- Location within California Location within the United States
- Location: Ventura County, California, United States
- Nearest city: Oxnard, California
- Coordinates: 34°12′0″N 119°14′57″W
- Area: 92 acres (37 ha)
- Established: 1985; 41 years ago
- Governing body: County of Ventura

Mandalay State Beach is a protected beach in the city of Oxnard, California, United States. Managed by the California Department of Parks and Recreation, the park preserves an area of undeveloped sand dunes and wetlands that was once common along the 16.5-mile-long (26.6 km) coastline of the Oxnard Plain.

== History ==
The 92-acre (37 ha) site was established as a California state park in 1985 to preserve public access to the beach while providing for continued protection of the adjacent natural area. Snowy plovers and least terns nest on the beach.

== Facilities ==
Day-use access is available for the 2,920 feet (890 m) of shoreline. There are no support facilities within the park or on the adjacent city beach. Ample parking on the adjacent public streets provides an access point for California Coastal Trail.

Beachwalkers may reach McGrath State Beach upcoast and Oxnard Beach Park downcoast. These parks can also be reached by the Pacific Coast Bicycle Route on Harbor Boulevard. Mandalay Beach Road is close to the beach and provides an alternate route through the Oxnard Shores neighborhood using public streets and bicycle/walking trails to destinations south, including Channel Islands Harbor and the Channel Islands Beach neighborhood.

== See also ==
- List of beaches in California
- List of California state parks
  - List of state beaches in California
