= South Mountain Oil Field =

Oil field adjacent to Santa Paula, California, United States

Coordinates: 34.3329°N 119.0297°W

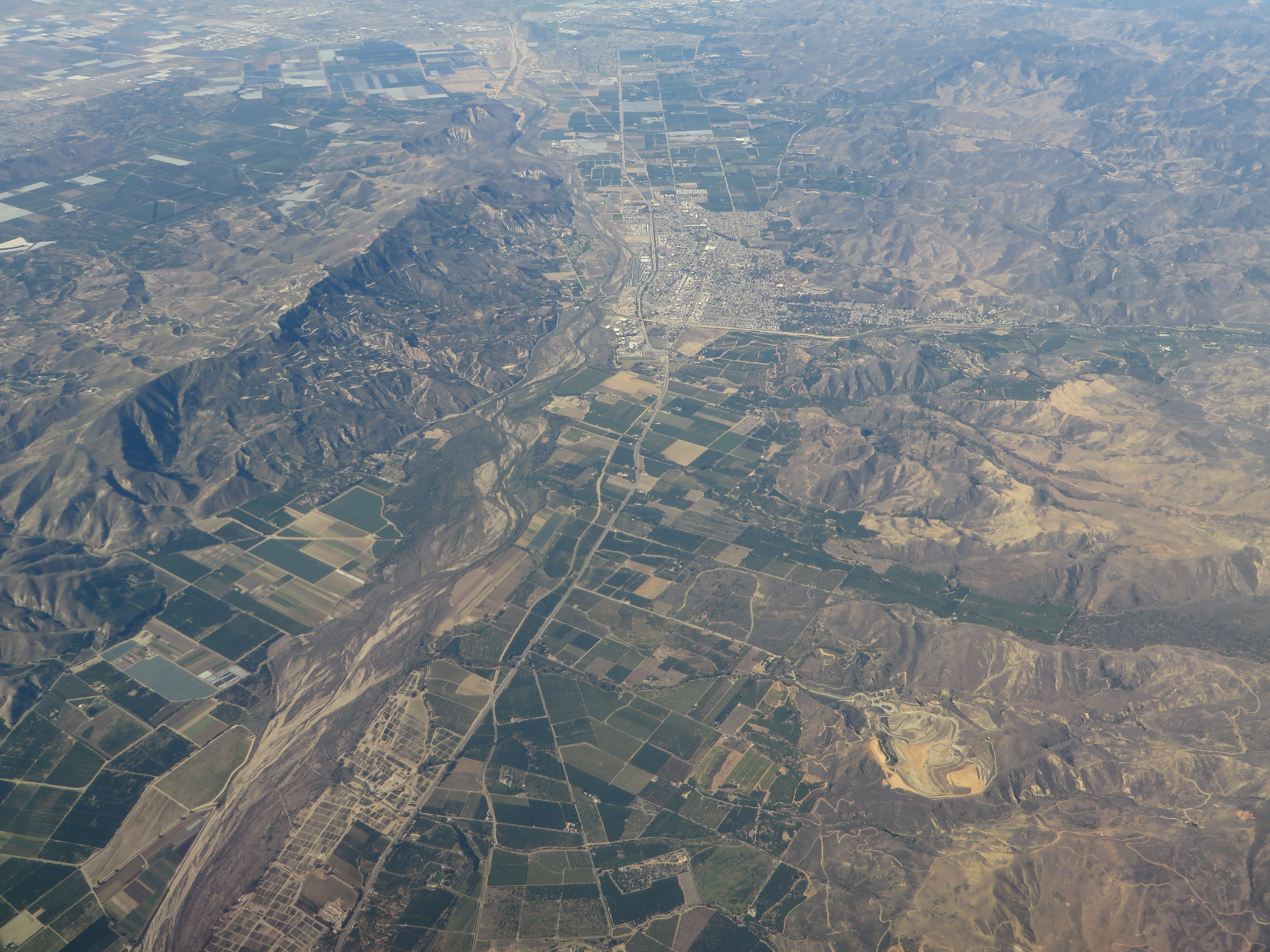
South Mountain Oil Field and Santa Paula, California, 2015

The South Mountain Oil Field is a large and productive oil field in Ventura County, California, in the United States, in and adjacent to the city of Santa Paula. Discovered in 1916, and having a cumulative production of over 165 million barrels (26,200,000 m^{3}) of oil out of its original 630 million, it is the 37th largest oil field in California and the second largest in Ventura County (after the Ventura field). As of the beginning of 2009, it retains 316 active wells, and has an estimated 1.4 million barrels (220,000 m^{3}) of oil remaining recoverable with current technology. Vintage Production, a subsidiary of Occidental Petroleum, was the largest operator as of 2009.

== Geographic setting ==
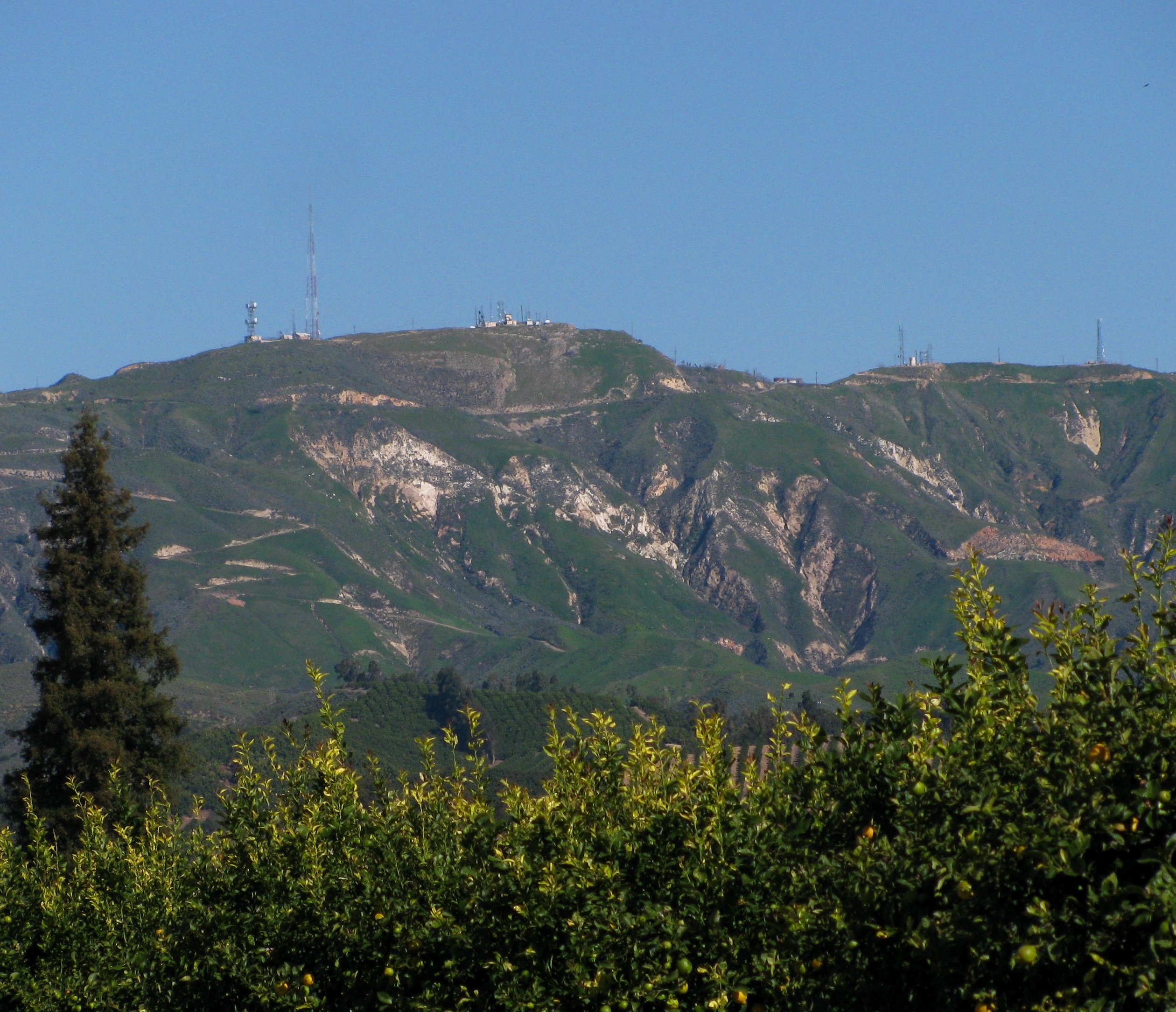
Top of South Mountain photographed from the south. The dirt roads on the side lead to active oil wells; most of the oil field is on the other side of the peak.

The oil field covers most of the north slope, the summit, and part of the south slope of topographically prominent South Mountain, southeast of Santa Paula. Adjacent to the west and southwest is the small West Mountain Oil Field and the Saticoy Oil Field, which follows the north bank of the Santa Clara River. Land use is relatively unmixed, as the entire mountain is inaccessible to the public; areas not developed for oil and gas production are left in their natural state, excepting an area of orchards on Richardson Canyon Road near the north entrance to the field. Native vegetation on the mountain consists of chaparral, coastal sage scrub, and oak woodlands.

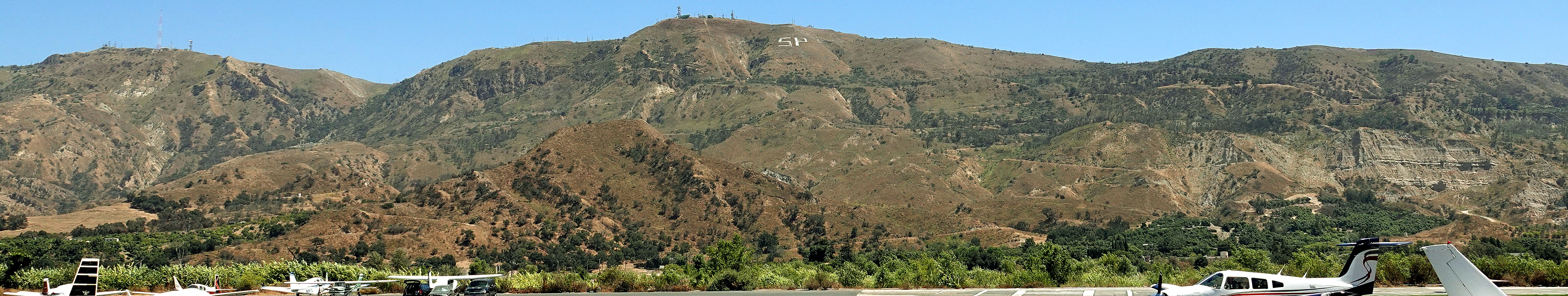
South Mtn from North at KSZP

Elevations on the oil field range from around 230 feet (70 m) on the bank of the Santa Clara River to 2,308 feet (703 m) at the topmost point of South Mountain. Drainage from the mountain to the north is into the Santa Clara River and then out to the Pacific Ocean. The south slope of the mountain drains via several canyons that flow into Calleguas Creek, which empties into the Pacific via Mugu Lagoon at the western foot of the Santa Monica Mountains.

The climate in the region is Mediterranean, with cool, rainy winters and warm, rainless summers, in which the heat is moderated by frequent morning coastal low clouds and fog. Annual precipitation is around 15 inches (380 mm), almost all in the winter, and all in the form of rain, with occasional dustings of snow on the mountaintop in exceptionally cold winter storms. The mean annual temperature is 56 to 60 degrees Fahrenheit; freezes occur rarely.

Because the terrain is almost uniformly steep and difficult, well drilling has been done on pads graded flat in areas suitably stable, and many wells are grouped and drilled directionally from these pad locations. These groups contain from 2 to 12 wells, especially on the steepest parts of the mountain near the top of the ridge. Directional drilling is necessary to have the well completions, deep underground, spaced in an optimal manner, rather than clustered, as they are at the surface. The total productive area of the oil field is 2,670 acres (1,081 ha).

== Geology ==
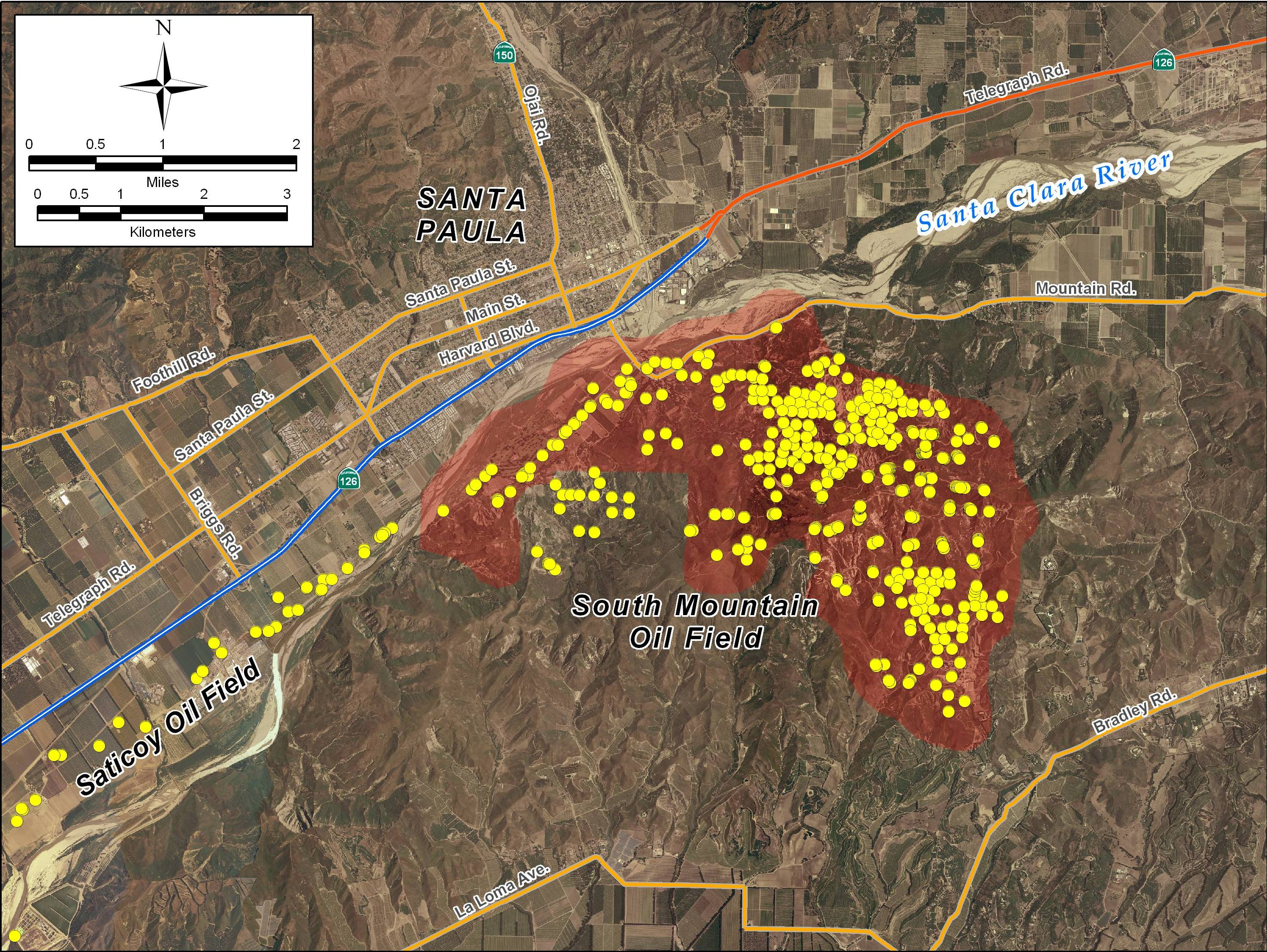
Detail of the South Mountain field, showing its location relative to Santa Paula in the Santa Clara River Valley. Yellow dots represent locations of active oil wells as of 2008.

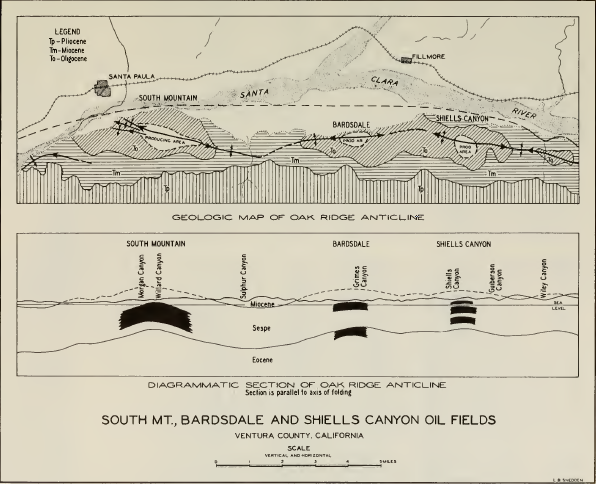
South Mountain Geological map and Cross Section

The South Mountain field is one of several oil fields within the Oak Ridge Anticline, a large anticlinal structure upthrown over the Oak Ridge reverse fault. Tectonic forces caused by the collision and lateral movement of the North American and Pacific Plates have compressed the area of the Oxnard and Ventura Basins from north to south, resulting in structural folds; oil has collected in those folds which form an anticlinal trapping mechanism. Extensive faulting is a secondary trapping mechanism, as the fault offsets have brought impermeable rock adjacent to oil-bearing formations, preventing further upward migration of hydrocarbons.

Oil in the South Mountain field is found in two producing horizons, one on each side of the Oak Ridge Fault. The larger pool, and the one first to be discovered, is in the Oligocene-age Sespe Formation, trapped in the huge anticline of which South Mountain is the surface expression. The pool north of the Oak Ridge Fault, known as the "Bridge" pool, is in the Pliocene-age Pico Formation.

Oil gravity in the Sespe pool is medium, averaging about 22 API, and has a relatively high sulfur content, at 2.79% by weight. Oil in the Bridge pool is lighter with lower sulfur, having an average API gravity of 33. Oil in the field is relatively young, with an estimated age of about 2 million years, and likely originated in the underlying Monterey Formation. The lack of free gas in the field is used as evidence for the young age of the oil; the same condition prevails at other oil fields adjacent to the Ventura Basin. Additionally, biomarkers and hydrocarbon source modeling suggest a recent origin for the oil: the Monterey Formation is a fertile source rock for hydrocarbons and continues to produce oil, which migrates upwards, filling available reservoirs over time-spans measured in hundreds of thousands to millions of years.

== History, production and operations ==
The field was discovered in April 1916 by now-defunct Oak Ridge Oil Co., which completed the discovery well into the Sespe Formation and found oil around 3,000 feet (910 m) below ground surface. While the first well was not a huge producer, bringing in only 25 barrels per day (4.0 m^{3}/d), it was sufficient to encourage further exploration, and in the next year Oak Ridge Oil put in two more wells at shallower depths which produced approximately the same amount. Other companies attempted to exploit the field, and in July 1917 the Santa Paula Oil Company brought in a 100-barrel (16 m^{3})-per-day well at a depth of around 2,000 feet.

Gradually the field began to sprout drilling rigs wherever stability conditions allowed. On the average, about eight new wells per year went in between 1917 and 1929. Engineering the field was a challenge, because the steep terrain was prone to landslides and mudslides during the rainy season. After 1929, due to economic conditions during the Great Depression (including a sharp decline in the price of oil), the pace of well development slackened; only 11 wells were drilled between 1930 and 1942, less than one per year.

As the field was developed, gas pressure gradually declined, reducing the danger of blowouts, an occurrence which had been common in the early days of the field's development, and which was relatively commonplace prior to the advent of modern blowout-prevention technology. Many of the canyons on the north side of the mountain were dammed with earthen berms to form improvised sumps or catchment basins for wells which blew out in the 1920s. By 1941, gas pressure within the reservoir had declined to the point that the last freely flowing well stopped producing on its own, and needed to have a pump put in, so all the wells on the field were on the pump. At the end of 1943, the field contained 93 wells which were producing oil.

In December 1955, the Bridge producing horizon was discovered, at about 7,500 feet (2,300 m) below ground surface in the Pliocene-age Pico Formation, and the discovery well flowed over 200 barrels (32 m^{3}) in the first day. This turned out to be another productive reservoir, with an average thickness of 600 feet (180 m) for the producing formation.

In spite of the methodical early development of the field, the peak production did not occur until 1959, after the waterflood in the Sespe zone had been running for three years, and four years after the discovery of the productive Bridge zone north of the Oak Ridge Fault. In 1959 the field produced over 7.4 million barrels (1,180,000 m^{3}) of oil and in 1960 15.6 billion cubic feet (440,000,000 m^{3}) of natural gas.

In the 1990s, the major oil companies pulled out of the field and sold their holdings to independent and smaller operators. This event mirrored a trend throughout coastal and offshore California, as the firms with large financial resources and international holdings decided to focus on easier-to-exploit oil fields elsewhere in the world. Texaco, formerly the Texas Company, which had been one of the field's major operators in the 1940s, sold their holdings to Vintage Production; Union Oil sold many of its holdings to Torch Operating Company, which sold them to Mirada Petroleum; Shell Oil sold its holdings to a Vintage Petroleum subsidiary. When Occidental Petroleum acquired Vintage in 2006, they effectively took over production of most of the field, although it still runs under the Vintage banner.

In 2010, there were 316 active wells remaining on the field, and 8 operators, of which Vintage Petroleum was by far the largest, with 266 wells. Mirada Petroleum had 21, and The Termo Co. had 18; several other small operators owned between 1 and 3 wells each. As a mature field, production was in a steady decline, with only 454,000 barrels (72,200 m^{3}) pumped from the field in 2008. Average daily production had dropped to approximately 4 barrels per day (0.64 m^{3}/d) for the Vintage wells, and was even less for some of the other operators.
