= Venoco =

American hydrocarbon company

Venoco, Inc.
- Company type: Defunct
- Industry: Petroleum industry
- Founded: 1992; 34 years ago
- Founder: Timothy Marquez
- Fate: Bankruptcy and liquidation
- Headquarters: Denver, Colorado, United States
- Key people: Mark A. DePuy, CEO; Timothy Marquez, co-founder, former CEO, Executive Chairman; Scott M. Pinsonnault, CFO
- Revenue: ▼$328 million (2015)
- Net income: ▲$62 million (2015)
- Total assets: ▲$929 million (2015)
- Total equity: ▲$73 million (2015)
- Number of employees: 162 (2015)

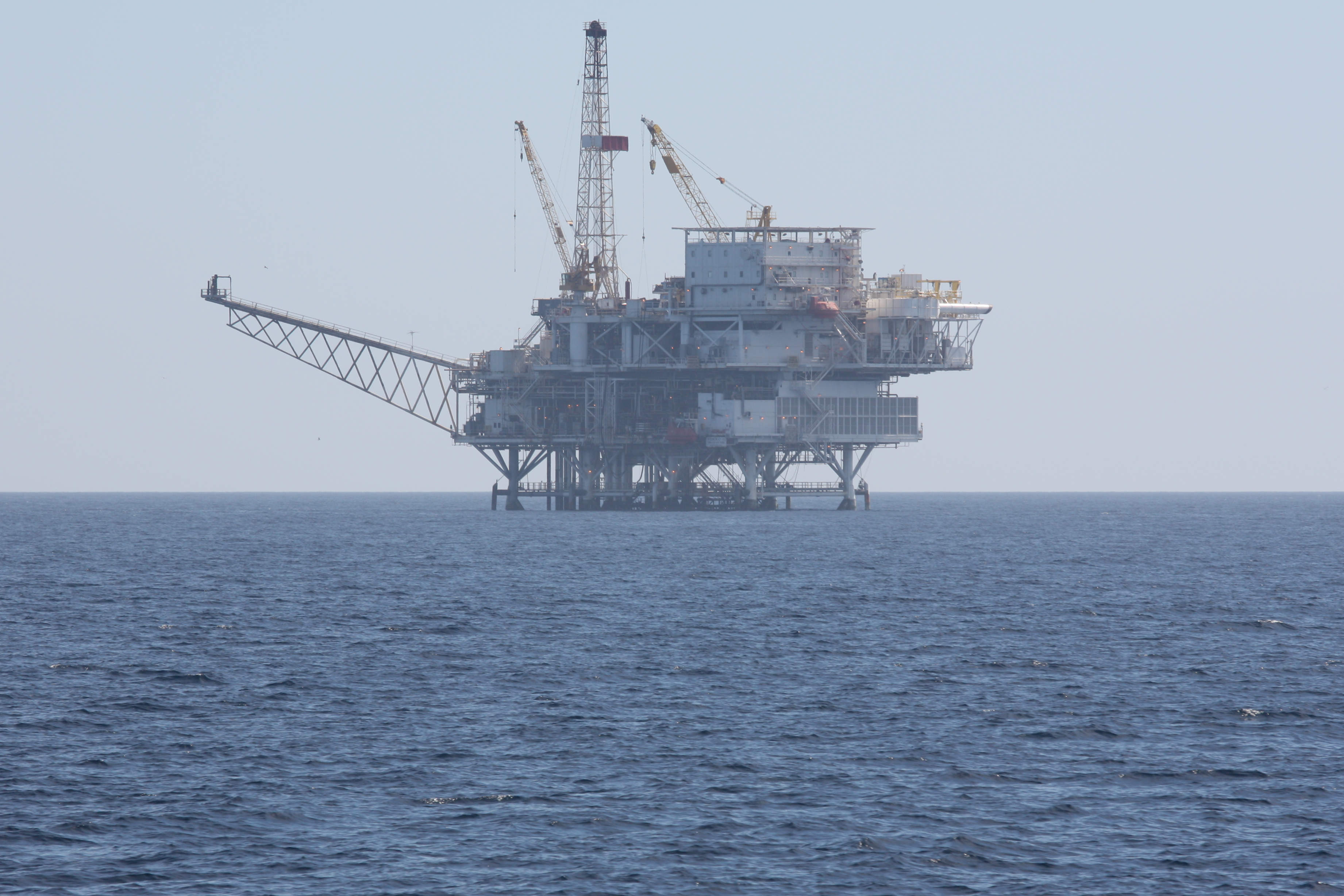
Venoco's Platform Gail in the Sockeye Field, Santa Barbara Channel

Venoco, Inc. was a company engaged in hydrocarbon exploration. It primarily operated in the Monterey Formation in California. In 2017, the company filed bankruptcy and was liquidated.

== History ==
The company was founded in September 1992 by Timothy Marquez.

In 2005, the company sold Big Mineral Creek field for $45 million.

In November 2006, the company became a public company via an initial public offering.

In 2007, the company acquired the West Montalvo Oil Field from Berry Petroleum Company for $63 million; it was sold in 2014 to California Resources Corporation for $200 million.

In 2011, the company spent $100 million to develop wells in the Monterey Formation.

In 2012, the company became a privately held company after Timothy Marquez acquired the 49% of the company that he did not own.

In 2015, the Refugio oil spill resulted in the closure of a pipeline upon which the company depended; as a result production was reduced by 50%. In March 2016, the company filed bankruptcy.

On April 17, 2017, Venoco filed bankruptcy again and began liquidation. At that time, the company was owned by affiliates of Apollo Global Management.

On January 4, 2018, the company relinquished 5 federal oil and gas leases offshore Southern California.

=== Fracking controversy ===
In 2011, a group of concerned citizens opposed Venoco's fracking operations in the Monterey Formation. The Santa Barbara County Board of Supervisors initially cited Venoco for fracking without a permit, but later withdrew the claim. The site of the test wells was in a valley adjacent to two wine-producing regions, Santa Ynez Valley AVA and Santa Maria Valley AVA.

In the Salinas basin, in Monterey County, Venoco encountered opposition by environmental groups and concerned citizens over 9 proposed wells. Among the components listed in Venoco's proposed fracking fluid for Monterey County was a gelling agent with a 60 to 70% concentration of "petroleum distillate blend." The exact mixture was unknown as it is proprietary to manufacturer Baker Hughes.
