= Oxnard Oil Field =

Oil field in Oxnard, California, United States

Coordinates: 34.1980°N 119.1357°W

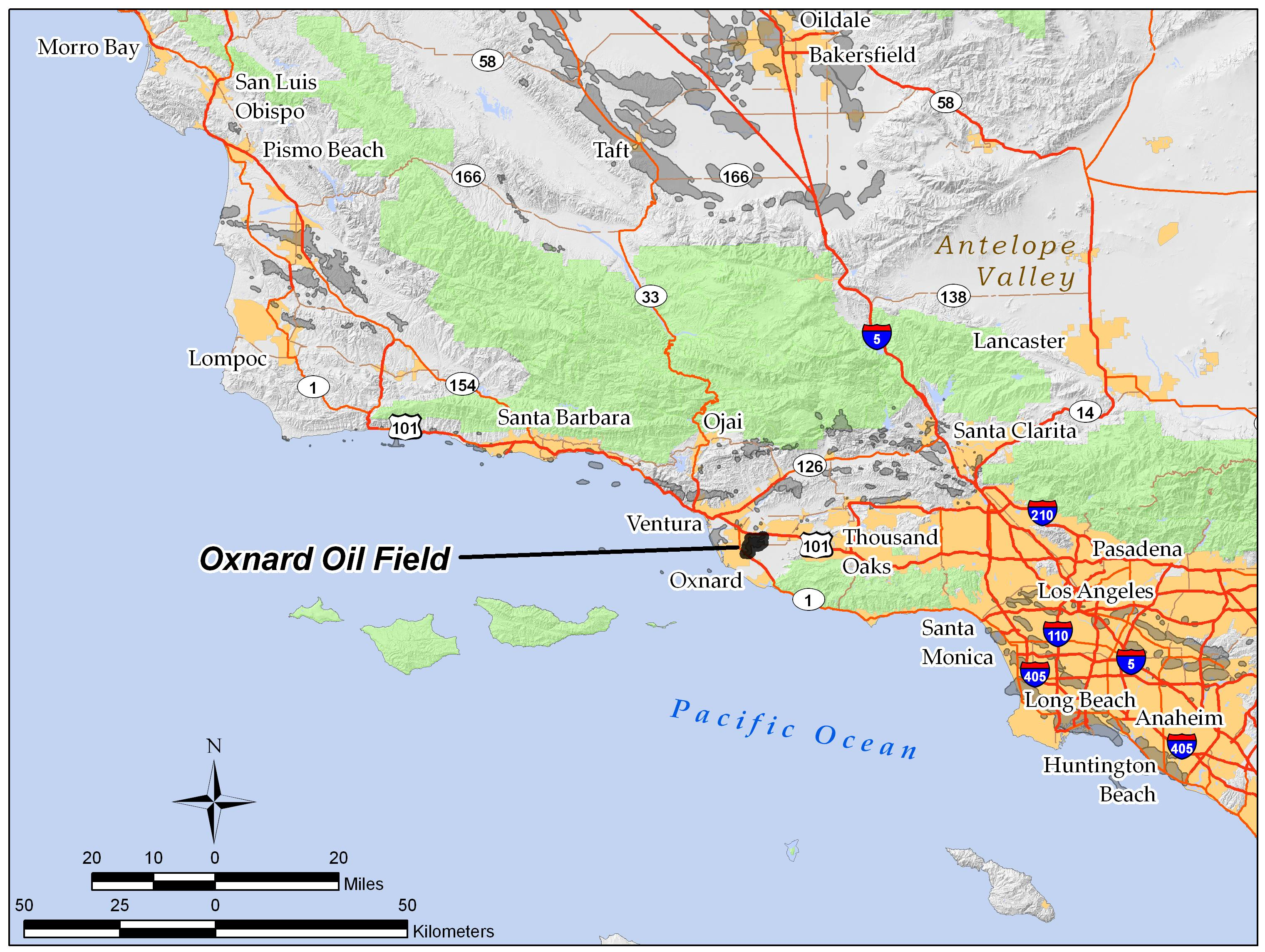
The Oxnard Oil Field in Ventura County, California. Other oil fields are shown in dark gray.

The Oxnard Oil Field is a large and productive oil field in and adjacent to the city of Oxnard, in Ventura County, California, in the United States. Its conventional oil reserves are close to exhaustion, with only an estimated one percent of the original oil recoverable with current technology remaining: 434,000 barrels (69,000 m^{3}) out of an original 43.5 million. However, the reservoir includes an enormous deposit of tar sands, ultra-heavy oil classed as an unconventional petroleum reserve, and potentially containing 600 million barrels (95,000,000 m^{3}) of oil equivalent, should it become economically feasible to extract. Present operators on the field include Tri-Valley Oil & Gas Co., Anterra Energy Services, Inc., Chase Production Co., and Occidental Petroleum through its Vintage Production subsidiary. As of the beginning of 2009, there were 34 active wells on the field.

== Geographic setting ==
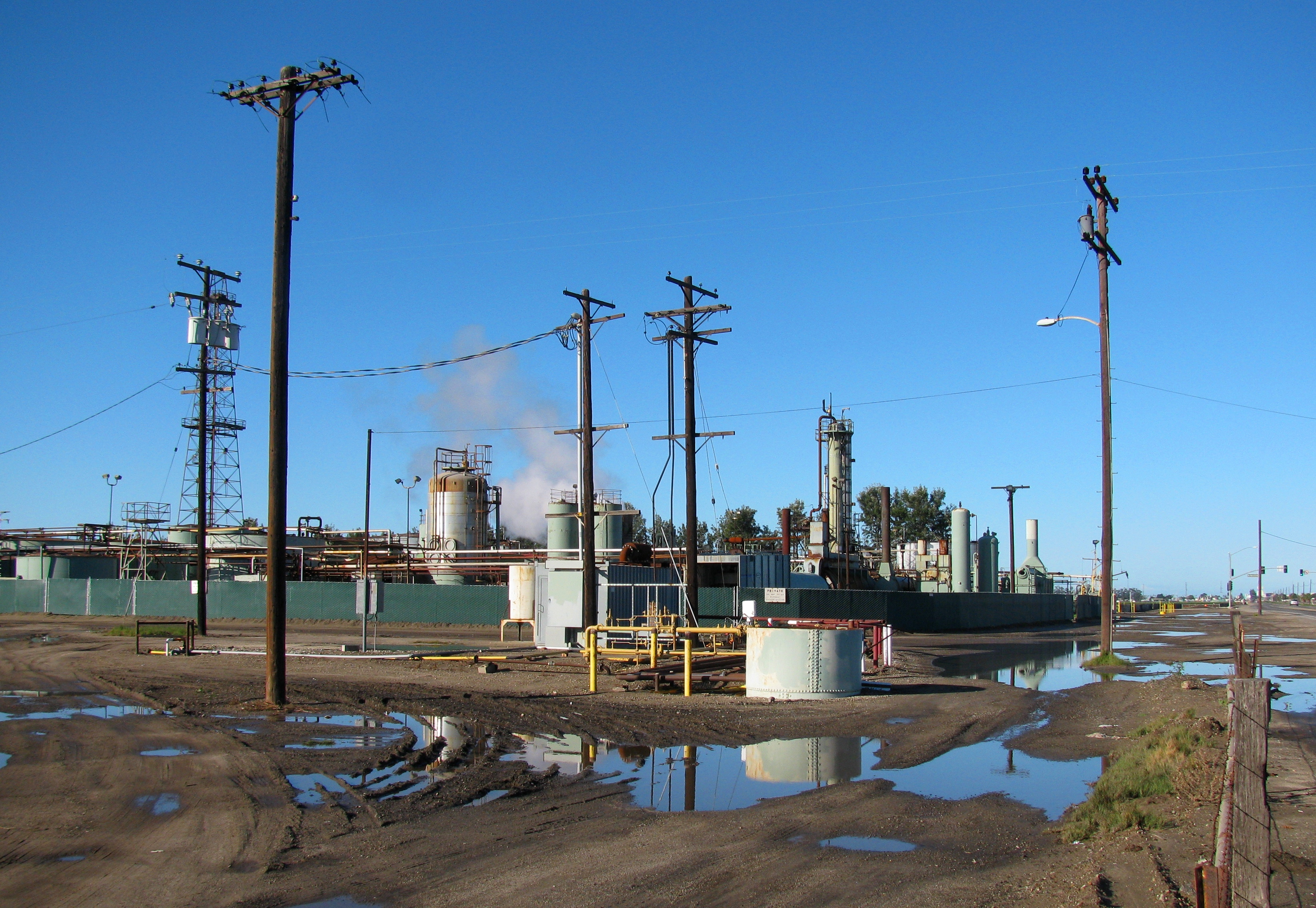
Oxnard Refinery, a 2,800-barrel-per-day oil processing facility; oil from the Oxnard field as well as the Montalvo field to the west comes here.

The Oxnard Oil Field is one of several beneath the Oxnard Plain, an area mostly protected agricultural land with the communities of Ventura, Oxnard, and Camarillo separated by greenbelts. In the vicinity of the oil field, agriculture remains the predominant land use, and oil wells, processing facilities, and associated infrastructure are interspersed with fields planted with crops such as strawberries, broccoli, and onions. Parts of the field, particularly on the west, have been given over to light industrial and commercial development as the Oxnard metropolitan area expands to the east. U.S. Highway 101 bounds the field on the north; California State Route 34 (Oxnard's East 5th Street) cuts across it from east to west, and Rice Avenue crosses it from north to south. Most of the currently active oil wells are in the eastern portion of the field, west of the intersection of 5th Street and Pleasant Valley Road. Some active wells remain west of Rice Avenue, and a group of wells using directional drilling is clustered together in a drilling island near the northeast corner of the intersection of Rose Avenue and Wooley Road. The total productive area of the field projected to the surface is 1,350 acres (546 ha).

The climate in the region is Mediterranean, with cool, rainy winters and warm, rainless summers, in which the heat is moderated by frequent morning coastal low clouds and fog. Annual precipitation is around 15 inches (380 mm), almost all in the winter, and all in the form of rain. The mean annual temperature is 56 to 60 °F (16 °C); freezes occur rarely. Elevations on the field range from about 40 to 60 feet (18 m) above sea level. It is mostly flat, with a very gentle slope to the south-southeast; drainage is along Revolon Slough to Calleguas Creek to Mugu Lagoon, and then to the Pacific Ocean.

== Geology ==
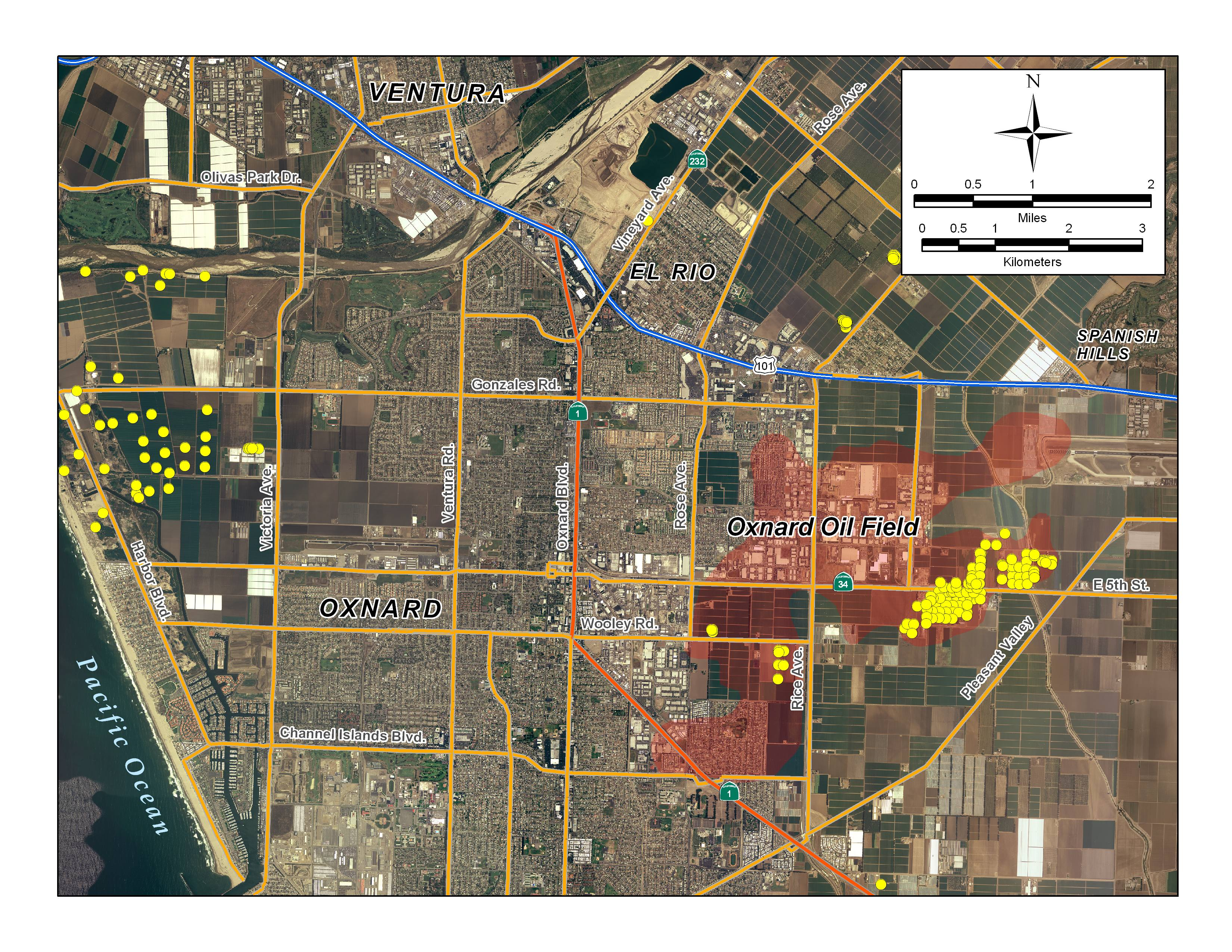
Detail of the Oxnard field, showing its location relative to Ventura, Oxnard, and other urbanized areas. Yellow dots represent locations of active oil wells as of 2008.

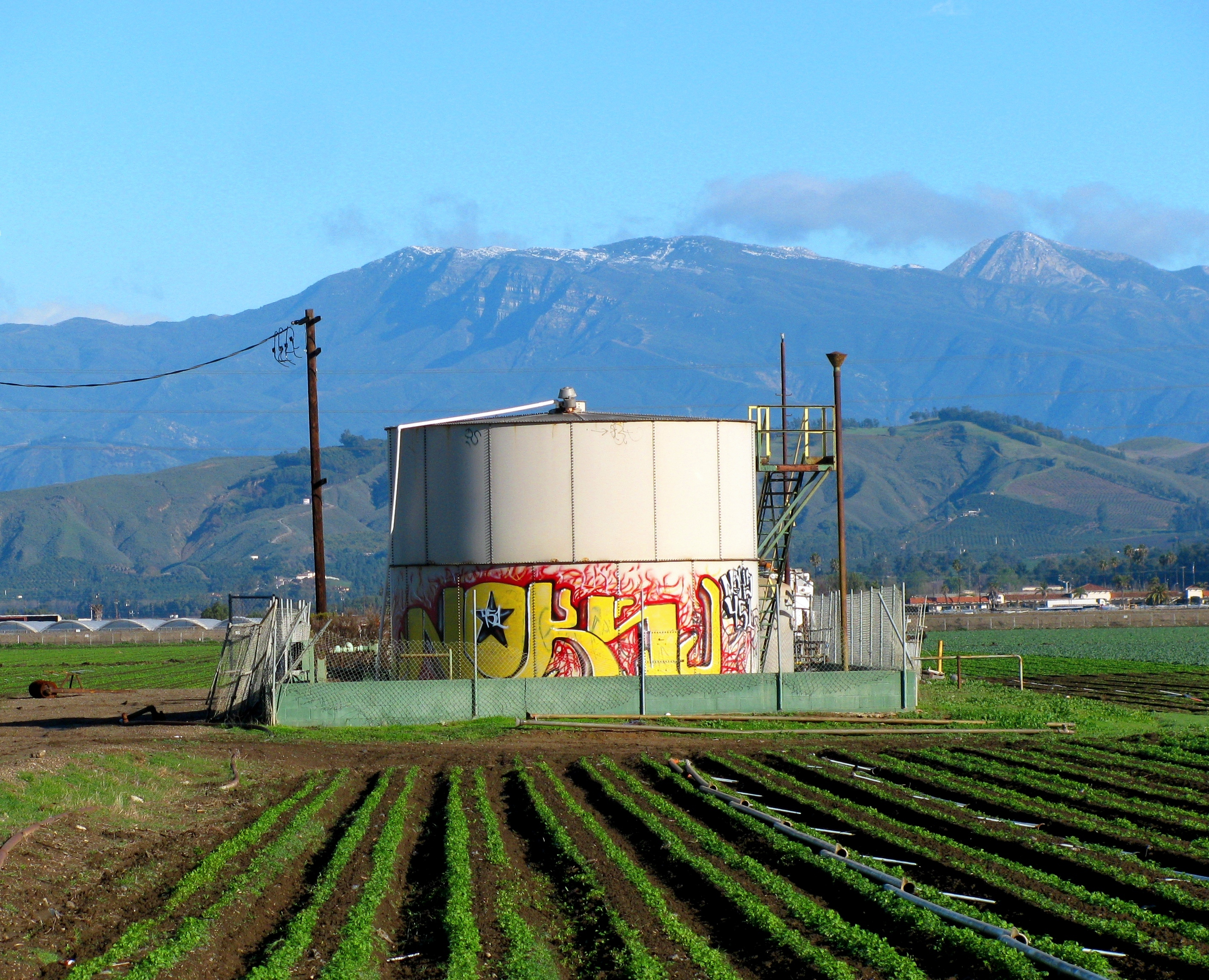
Oil storage tank adjacent to Tri-Valley center of operations.

The Oxnard field is within the Ventura Basin Province of southern California. Geologically, this area is part of a structural downwarp that occurred during the late Pliocene. Rocks within the region are all sedimentary and mostly marine. Oil accumulations, of which there are many in the Ventura province, mainly occur in anticlinal settings modified by faulting; stratigraphy is also influential in creating traps for hydrocarbons. Where the sedimentary rocks are sandstones with high porosity, and the structure and stratigraphy allow hydrocarbons to be trapped on their upward migration, oilfields are found.

As the oil field is in the center of a large flat alluvial floodplain, there is no surface expression of any anticlinal structure capable of holding oil. Under the surface alluvium, a series of relatively impermeable sedimentary units cap the petroleum-bearing formation. On top are the Pleistocene San Pedro and Pleistocene-upper Pliocene Santa Barbara formations; under that the Pico Sands, of Pliocene age, which contain areas of tar sands; under that, separated by an unconformity, the Monterey Formation, of Miocene age, which also contains tar sands (the Vaca Tar Sand); under that, again separated by an unconformity, the relatively impermeable Conejo-Topanga Formation, which caps the faulted anticlinal structure containing medium-grade oil about 6,500 feet (2,000 m) below ground surface. This producing horizon is named the "McInnes" pool, and is in the Oligocene-age Sespe Formation.

The Oxnard field contains a large quantity of tar sand, a type of bitumen which is categorized as an unconventional oil deposit. The average depth below ground surface of the tar sands – both the Vaca Sand, and the Pico Sand – is about 2,500 feet (760 m), and their thickness ranges from 0 to 600 feet (180 m), representing a total volume of 405,000 acre-feet (500,000,000 m^{3}), equivalent to approximately 565 million barrels (89,800,000 m^{3}) of oil for both units, were it possible to recover their petroleum content. Only a tiny fraction of this has been brought to the surface to date, although Tri-Valley Corporation is actively developing the unit by drilling horizontal wells through the sands and subjecting them to the cyclic steam process. According to Tri-Valley, some of the test wells have shown production rates of 1,000 barrels per day (160 m^{3}/d), and can be brought online as soon as the steam generators and storage infrastructure are in place on the field.

The quality of the oil from the lower pools is good and the gravity medium, at 24 to 38 API, while the oil from the tar sand is extremely heavy and of poor quality, with an extraordinarily high sulfur content – API gravity of 5-7, viscosity of 28,000 to 33,000 centipoise, and sulfur content of between 5 and 7.5 percent by weight.

== History, production and operations ==
The field was discovered in January 1937 by Vaca Oil Exploration Co., which drilled into tar sands about 2,800 feet (850 m) below ground surface. In spite of the extremely viscous petroleum deposits in the producing formation, which they named after their firm – the Pliocene "Vaca" Tar Sand – they were able to produce about 50 barrels per day (7.9 m^{3}/d). In May of that same year they discovered tar sands in the underlying Monterey Formation from which they were able to produce about 90 barrels (14 m^{3}) of oil per day.

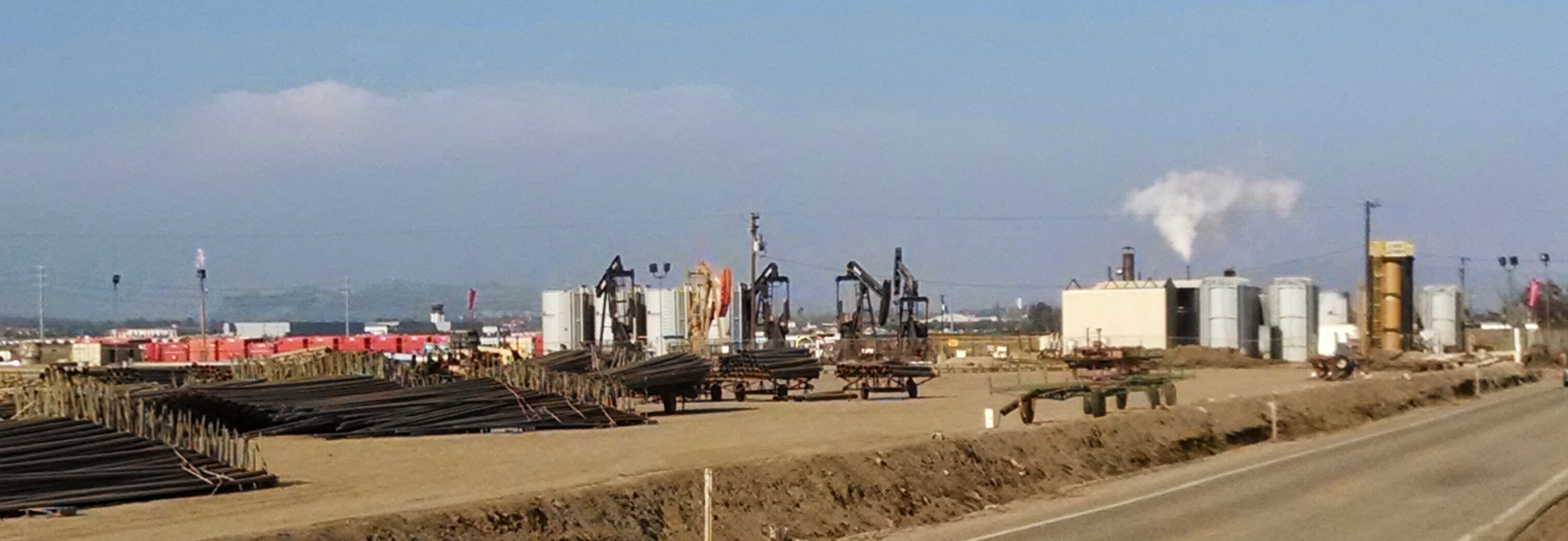
Oil wells, tanks, and burn-off flame (left). Agriculture irrigation pipes storage (foreground).

More adventurous drillers found deeper producing horizons with lighter oil. In 1953 and 1954 the McInnes, Lucas, and Livingston pools were brought online, producing oil of API gravity 24, 32 and 25-36 respectively. Waterflooding operations in these deeper reservoirs in the 1960s assisted production, but most wells in these horizons were abandoned as the last economically recoverable oil was extracted; a few remained as water disposal wells, as it is usually both economically and environmentally preferable to reinject wastewater back into a depleted reservoir than to treat and release it on the surface. In 2008 only two wells remained active in the deep McInnes reservoir; all the others were in the shallow tar sands.

Under the California Department of Conservation well adoption rule, Tri-Valley Oil & Gas Company acquired 20 wells formerly operated by defunct GEO Petroleum, Inc., which filed for Chapter 11 bankruptcy protection in 1998. Wells declared deserted by the State – typically due to the dissolution of the operator – are open to adoption and redevelopment under the "orphan well" rule, with the written consent of the owner of the mineral rights to the property as well as the State Department of Oil, Gas, and Geothermal Resources. In 2008 Tri-Valley began redeveloping these wells and bringing them back to production.

Oil produced in the field goes to the small (2,800-barrel (450 m^{3})-per-day) Oxnard Refinery, owned by Tenby, Inc., in an unincorporated area south of Fifth Street near the eastern Oxnard city limit. This refinery also processes oil from the West Montalvo field on the coast directly west of the Oxnard field.

== Oil field waste ==
Between 1950 and 1981 Mandalay Bay was a permitted oil field waste disposal site which caused the release of numerous hazardous chemicals. The records of what was dumped were subsequently lost, resulting in calls for an investigation and millions of dollars in lawsuits from home buyers who were told the area was safe for habitation.

Anterra operates the only commercial facility that disposes oil field waste through injection wells in the county. In 1998, Anadime Energy Services Inc. applied for permission from the county of Ventura to operate a commercial disposal site at 1933 E. Wooley Road near the Oxnard city limits. This Canadian firm accepted waste from other oil field operators, mostly brine, and injects it thousands of feet into the ground. This permit held by Anterra expired in 2018 and the commercial oil disposal sites in agricultural land are no longer permitted by county zoning law. The county Board of Supervisors eliminated such a use in farmland two years after the 1998 permit was issued. They also denied a zoning change in 2015 that would have allowed expansion of the facility citing the many places of open space and industrial zones where the oil field disposal sites are permitted. They were unconvinced by the testimony that Ventura County, as the third-largest oil-producing region in the state, needs to allow brines to be disposed of effectively and cheaply. Anterra could have applied to continue operations at the current level when the permit expired. The Santa Clara Wastewater Facility, established in 1959 about 2 miles (3.2 km) southwest of Santa Paula, accepted such waste but without injection wells on site until it closed in 2014.
