= University House, Berkeley =

Historic building in Berkeley, California

- University House
- U.S. National Register of Historic Places
- Berkeley Landmark
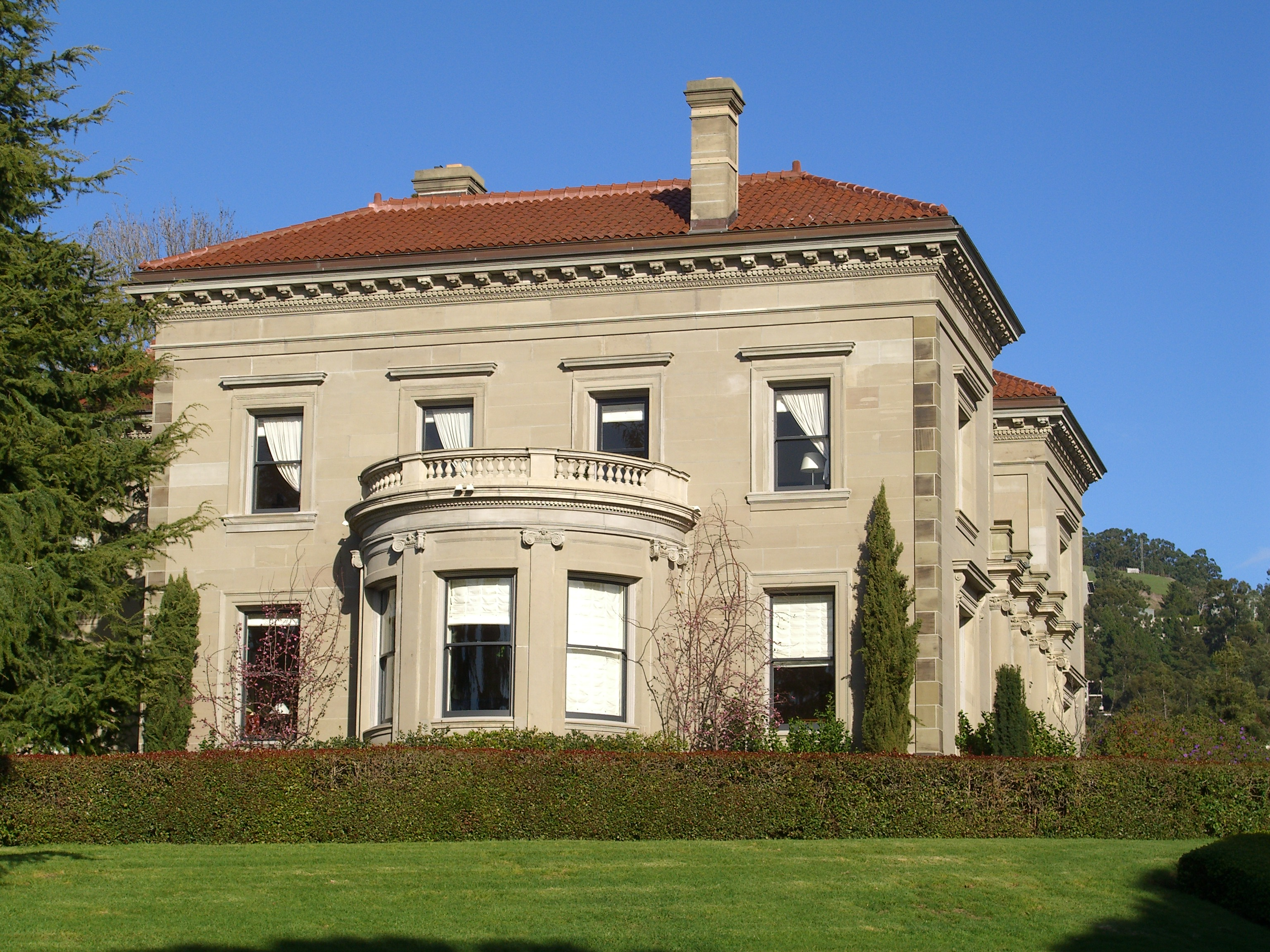
- University House (west end)

- Location within Oakland, California Location within California Location within the United States
- Location: Oxford St., Berkeley, California
- Coordinates: 37°52′28″N 122°15′44″W
- Area: 2.6 acres (1.1 ha)
- Built: 1911
- Architect: Albert Pissis
- Architectural style: Mediterranean villa
- MPS: Berkeley, University of California MRA
- NRHP reference No.: 82004652
- BERKL No.: 161

Significant dates
- Added to NRHP: March 25, 1982
- Designated BERKL: February 25, 1991

The University House is a residence and venue for official events on the campus of the University of California, Berkeley. Designed by the architect Albert Pissis and completed in 1911, it was formerly named President's House while it served as the home of the president of the University of California, starting with Benjamin Ide Wheeler and ending with Robert Gordon Sproul. Since 1965, it has been the home of the Chancellor of the Berkeley campus.

== Design ==
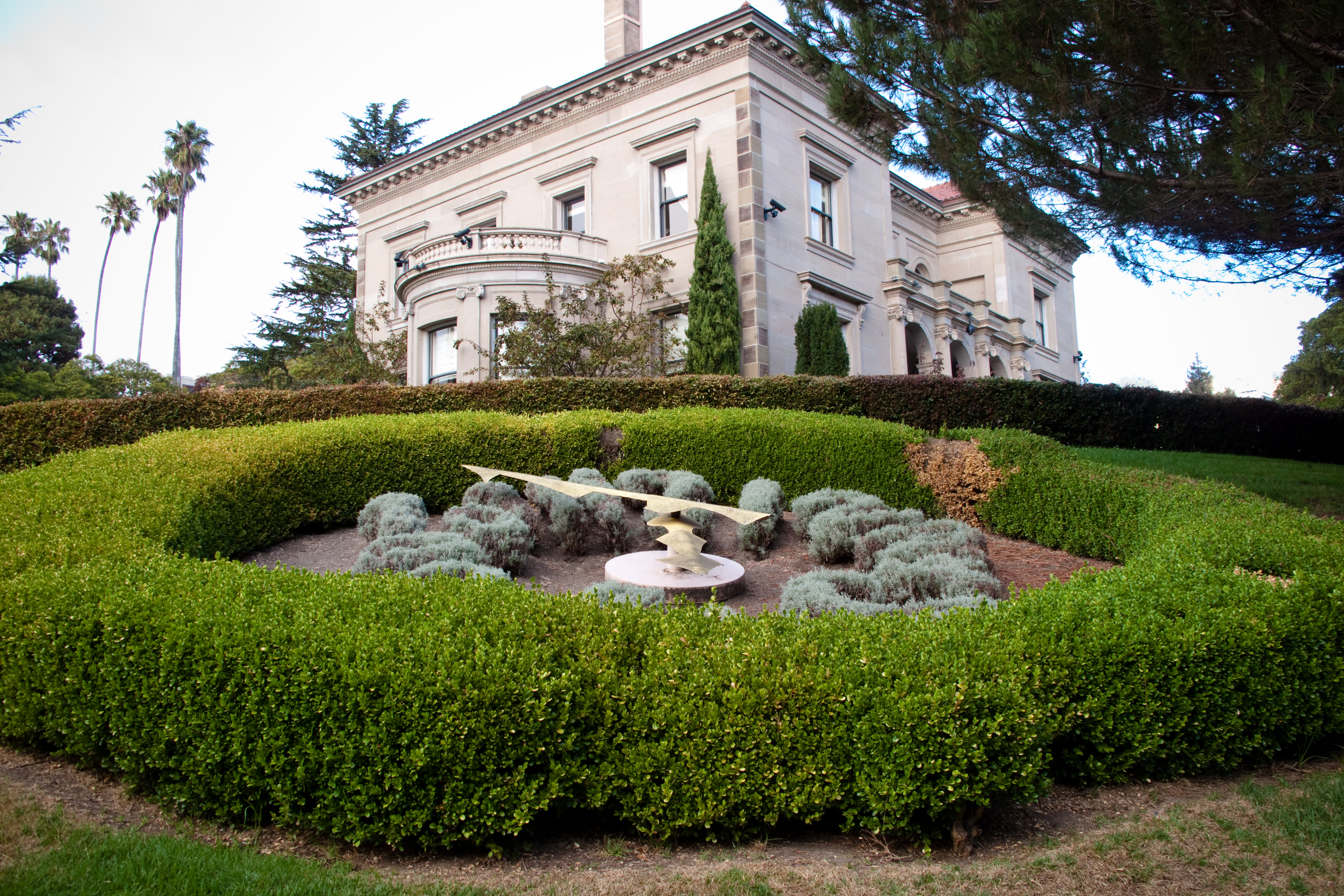
Western and southern facades, featuring topiary clock

The exterior of the building is designed as a classical Mediterranean villa; the front fascia faces south onto the main campus axis, which runs east into the Berkeley Hills from the Crescent Lawn on Oxford Street. The front entrance is in a triple-arched, recessed portico, and the east and west ends of the mansion have round bays with balustrades. The interior and grounds were designed by John Galen Howard in 1910 after it was decided to finish it as a residence for the President. The grounds surrounding University House are 2 1/2 acres (1.0 ha) and include a rose garden, greenhouse, and cutting garden. The formal gardens lie east of the structure. One of the features added later is a large topiary clock, southwest of the residence, donated by the Swiss government.

The front door opens onto a reception hall with a stairway to the second floor; a living room lies to the west and drawing and dining rooms lie to the east. The Chancellor (and their spouse) usually live in the private quarters on the second floor of the home, while the ground floor is used for receptions and other events. The home features art on loan from the Berkeley Art Museum and Pacific Film Archive.

It is the only actual residence in the historic central core of the Berkeley campus, as all student housing lies outside the core campus, but within walking distance.

== History ==
Under the original ROMA design by French architect Émile Bénard, there was to be a "jurisprudence" building at the present-day site. Bénard had won a competition to design the entire University of California campus sponsored by wealthy benefactor Phoebe Apperson Hearst in September 1899 with his entry entitled ROMA. However, he declined an appointment as the campus's supervising architect and John Galen Howard, who had placed fourth in the competition, was appointed instead in December 1901.

The commission for what would become President's House was let separately to Albert Pissis, who created a design in a classical Mediterranean style. Construction began on the building with a groundbreaking ceremony on May 16, 1901, presided over by Mrs. Hearst; a budget of US$215,000 (equivalent to $8,320,000 in 2025) had been appropriated, which proved to be inadequate and work stopped after September 1902. The building was completed in 1907. With the overcrowded campus, it was finished temporarily "into seminar rooms as a measure of relief" to accommodate some of the 2,669 students attending UC.

Of course I always have thought the President's House was beautifully proportioned. It had lovely big tall windows and high ceilings which give a sense of space. It was really a pleasure to live in it. You look out your window right through to the Golden Gate and Mt. Tamalpais. Oh, it's like a Maxfield Parrish [painting] with the beautiful light on it, that blue. It's beautiful. And it's exciting. The people you meet are exciting. You have such a variety of them. And in the President's House you were set up so that you could take care of them.

— Ida Amelia Wittschen Sproul, 1960 interview

President Benjamin Ide Wheeler moved there with his wife Amey (nee Webb) and their son, Benjamin Webb, just before Charter Day (March 23) 1911, inaugurating its use as the official residence. According to Ida Sproul, the Wheelers lived at 1820 Scenic because they could not afford to furnish the house. After moving in, one of the east-facing rooms was furnished by the Regents of the University of California as a guest bedroom. Amey Wheeler had a garden installed on the grounds to provide cut flowers for the House.

Under Ida Sproul, married to Robert Gordon Sproul (UC President, 1930–58), the stove was converted from coal to gas, and stainless steel sinks were installed to accommodate the dishes, washed by hand, generated by the crowds measured in "hundreds and hundreds" she would entertain for tea. The size of the parties kept growing, and to accommodate them, Ida Sproul initially rented, then purchased porcelain dishes; she never served a buffet meal during her leadership of President's House. When Chiura Obata, professor of art at Berkeley, and his family were interned during World War II, Ida Sproul offered the attic space at President's House to store their art and furniture; Obata's wife Haruko (an ikebana artist and teacher) had arranged flowers for the Sprouls once, which Ida recalled as "the nicest little flower arrangement ... not elaborate and not gaudy, but a little bit of color and maybe a pretty red leaf or something. She was just very good."

=== From president to chancellor ===
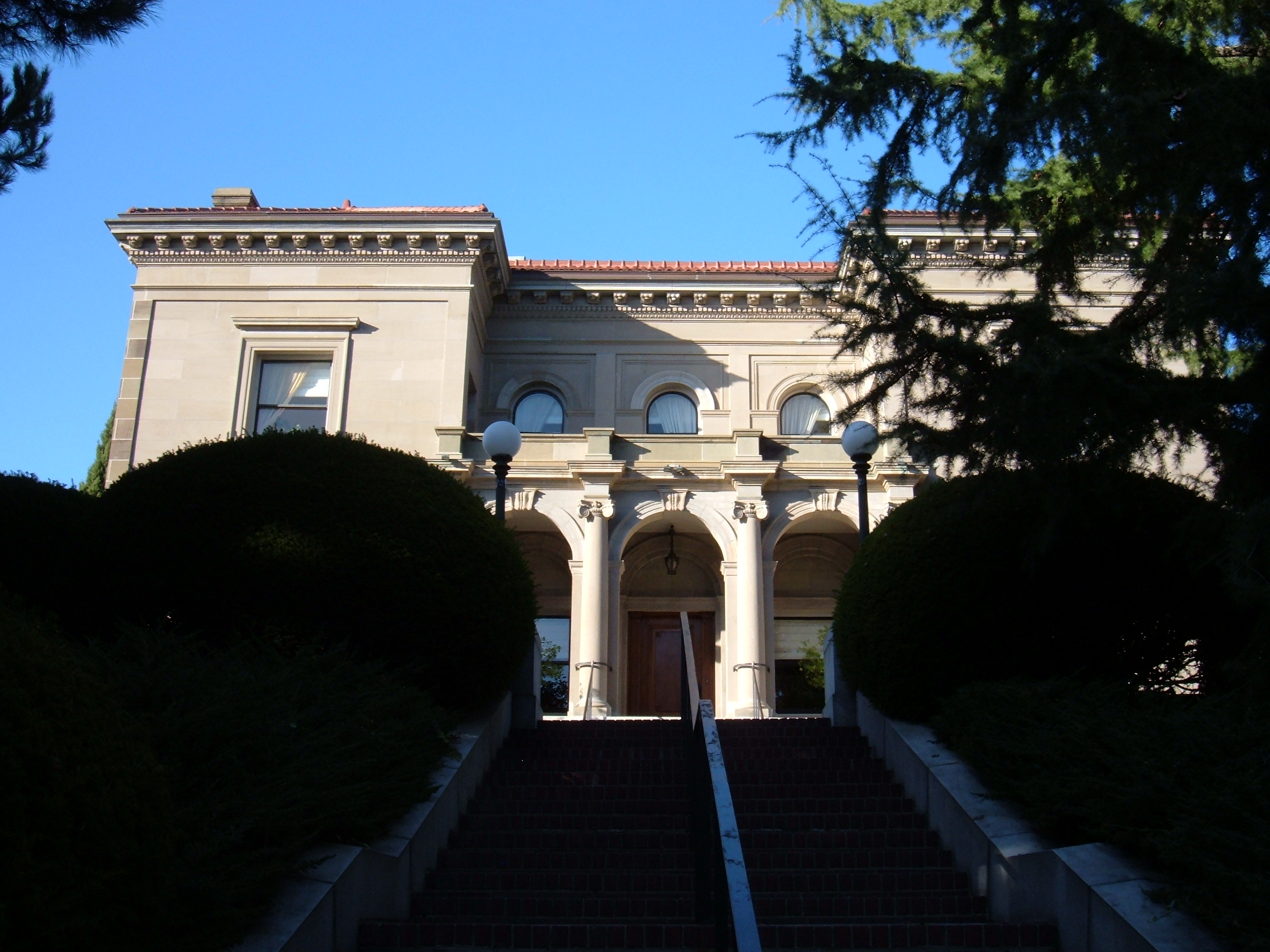
Front entrance with long staircase (2009)

Berkeley Chancellor Clark Kerr was named the President of the University of California in 1958 to succeed Sproul; instead of moving into President's House in accordance with tradition, the ex-professor preferred to remain in his private home in El Cerrito, and had the on-campus mansion remodeled to accommodate official events instead; it was renamed to University House. The first chancellor to live there was Roger W. Heyns, who moved into University House in 1965, followed by Albert H. Bowker in 1971.

University House was listed on the National Register of Historic Places on March 25, 1982 as part of a larger listing of contemporaneous structures on the Berkeley central campus defining its "formal, turn-of-the-century concept".

Selected locations on the campus of the University of California, Berkeley
- Buildings and venues
- Landmarks
1 University House (1911)
2 North Gate Hall (1906) and North Gate (1990)
3 Founders' Rock (1860)
4 Evans Hall (1971)
5 Hearst Memorial Mining Building (1907)
6 Hearst Greek Theatre (1903)
7 Crescent Lawn (1929) and Springer Plaza (1964)
8 Valley Life Sciences Building (1930)
9 Doe Memorial Library (1917)
10 South Hall (1873)
11 Sather Tower (1914)
12 Haas School of Business (1995)
13 Haas Pavilion (1933)
14 Sather Gate (1908)
15 Sproul Plaza (1962)
16 Hearst Memorial Gymnasium (1927)
17 College of Environmental Design (Bauer Wurster Hall, 1964)
18 School of Law (Boalt Hall, 1951)
19 California Memorial Stadium (1923)
20 People's Park (1969)

Rosebud Denovo was shot and killed by an Oakland Police Department officer after breaking into University House in the early morning of August 25, 1992. She was protesting the construction of sand volleyball courts at People's Park.

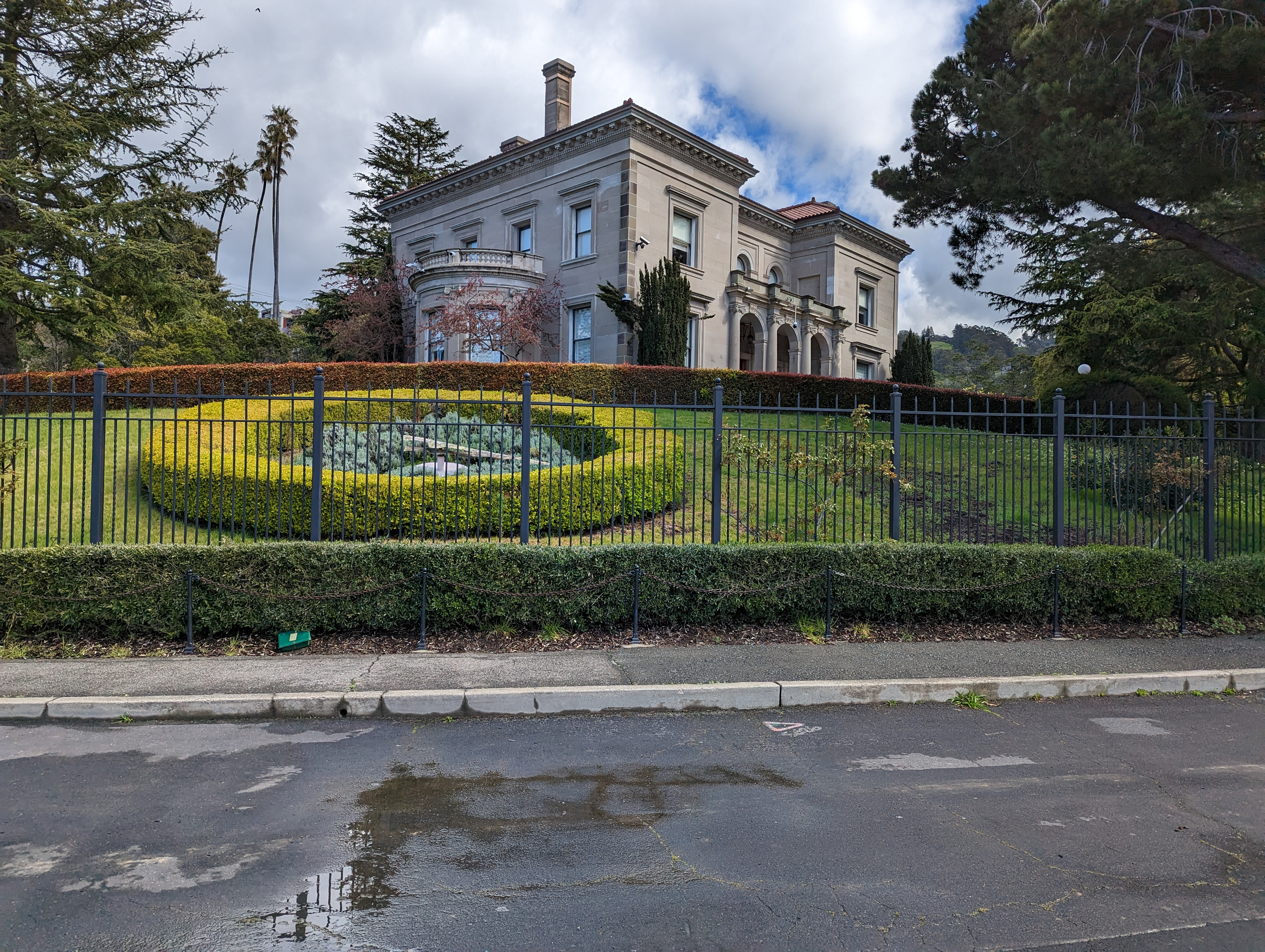
University House and fence (2023)

In 2009, protestors threw flower pots and a lit torch at the mansion, prompting round-the-clock police protection; eight were arrested, including two students. No charges were filed. A security fence was added in 2015 to exclude unauthorized people and police presence was planned to be decreased, but the fenceline also would close a popular route used by students to reach their classes; the fence was relocated closer to University House to avoid this. Protesters hopped over the incomplete fence that fall and demonstrated on the steps for workers' rights. Records showed the completed security fence cost nearly US$700,000, 2 1/2 times the original planned budget. When Carol T. Christ became chancellor in 2017, she chose to live in her private home near campus instead of University House.

== Residents ==
As "President's House" for the President of the University of California

- 1911–1919: Benjamin Ide Wheeler
- 1919–1923: David Prescott Barrows
- 1923–1930: William Wallace Campbell
- 1930–1958: Robert Gordon Sproul

As "University House" for the Chancellor of the University of California, Berkeley

- 1965–1971: Roger W. Heyns
- 1971–1980: Albert H. Bowker
- 1980–1990: Ira Michael Heyman
- 1990–1997: Chang-Lin Tien
- 1997–2004: Robert M. Berdahl
- 2004–2013: Robert J. Birgeneau
- 2013–2017: Nicholas B. Dirks
- 2024–Present: Rich Lyons
