= List of chancellors of the University of California, Berkeley =

The following is a list of chancellors of the University of California, Berkeley.

== List ==
The following persons had led the University of California, Berkeley from 1870 until 1952 as president and just the UC Berkeley campus since 1952 as chancellor.

No.	Image	President	Term start	Term end	Refs.
President, University of California
acting		John LeConte	June 15, 1869	August 16, 1870	
1		Henry Durant	August 17, 1870	November 6, 1872	
2		Daniel Coit Gilman	November 7, 1872	March 23, 1875	
3		John LeConte	March 24, 1875	August 22, 1881	
4		W.T. Reid	August 23, 1881	July 31, 1885	
5		Edward S. Holden	1885	March 22, 1888	
6		Horace Davis	March 23, 1888	September 15, 1890	
acting		Martin Kellogg	September 16, 1890	January 24, 1893	
7		Martin Kellogg	January 24, 1893	July 1899	
8		Benjamin Ide Wheeler	October 1, 1899	July 15, 1919	
–	The university was led by a committee of deans from July to December 1919.				
9		David Prescott Barrows	December 20, 1919	June 30, 1923	
10		William Wallace Campbell	July 1, 1923	June 30, 1930	
11		Robert Gordon Sproul	July 1, 1930	June 30, 1958 (Note: On July 1, 1952, the chancellor of the Berkeley campus became in charge with the day-to-day operations of the Berkeley campus, while the University of California president remained responsible for the entire UC system.)	
Chancellor, University of California, Berkeley
1		Clark Kerr	July 1, 1952	June 30, 1958	
2		Glenn T. Seaborg	August 15, 1958	January 19, 1961	
acting		Edward W. Strong	January 20, 1961	June 30, 1961	
3		Edward W. Strong	July 1, 1961	March 13, 1965 (Note: Officially, Strong went on a leave of absence for health reasons starting on January 2, 1965, but only officially resigned on March 13, 1965. During this period, Martin Meyerson served as acting chancellor.)	
acting		Martin E. Meyerson	January 2, 1965	September 30, 1965	
4		Roger W. Heyns	October 1, 1965	June 30, 1971	
acting		Robert E. Connick	July 1, 1971	July 31, 1971	
5		Albert H. Bowker	August 1, 1971	June 30, 1980	
6		Ira Michael Heyman	July 1, 1980	June 30, 1990	
7		Chang-Lin Tien	July 1, 1990	June 30, 1997	
8		Robert M. Berdahl	July 1, 1997	September 21, 2004	
9		Robert J. Birgeneau	September 22, 2004	May 31, 2013	
10		Nicholas Dirks	June 1, 2013	June 30, 2017	
11		Carol T. Christ	July 1, 2017	June 30, 2024	
12		Rich Lyons	July 1, 2024	present	

== See also ==
- List of presidents of the University of California
- List of chancellors of the University of California, Davis
- List of chancellors of the University of California, Irvine
- List of chancellors of the University of California, Los Angeles
- List of chancellors of the University of California, Merced
- List of chancellors of the University of California, Riverside
- List of chancellors of the University of California, San Diego
- List of chancellors of the University of California, San Francisco
- List of chancellors of the University of California, Santa Barbara
- List of chancellors of the University of California, Santa Cruz
