= Clark Kerr Award =

American annual higher education prize

- Awarded for: Outstanding contributions to the advancement of higher education
- Country: United States
- Presented by: University of California, Berkeley
- First award: 1968; 58 years ago
- Final award: 2022

The Clark Kerr Award, fully the Clark Kerr Award for Distinguished Leadership in Higher Education or the Clark Kerr Medal is an award given to a person who has made "an extraordinary and distinguished contribution to the advancement of higher education." The award is given annually by the Academic Senate of the University of California, Berkeley. The award was established in 1968 as a tribute to the leadership and legacy of Clark Kerr. He was an American professor of economics and academic administrator. He was the first chancellor of the University of California, Berkeley, and twelfth president of the University of California from 1958 to 1967. He played a key role in shaping the University of California system.

Recipients of the award have included scholars, academic administrators, Nobel Prize winners, businesspersons, and public officials who have had a transformative impact on higher education and on society more broadly. The award is considered one of the most prestigious honors in higher education.

== Recipients ==
List of awardees
Year	Winners
2024	Carol T. Christ Sue Desmond-Hellmann
2023	Robert Zimmer Amy Gutmann
2022	Constance M. Carroll Timothy P. White
2021	Eduardo J. Padrón Shirley Ann Jackson
2020	J. Michael Bishop John L. Hennessy
2019	Freeman A. Hrabowski III Diana Natalicio
2018	Richard C. Atkinson C. Judson King
2017	Mary Sue Coleman
2016	George W. Breslauer
2015	Hanna Holborn Gray
2014	Marye Anne Fox
2013	Ricardo Romo
2012	Marian C. Diamond Robert M. Berdahl
2010	William G. Bowen
2009	Charles E. Young
2008	Harold T. Shapiro
2007	Karl S. Pister
2006	Nannerl O. Keohane
2005	Jack W. Peltason
2004	Lee C. Bollinger
2002	John Hope Franklin
2000	Herbert F. York
1998	Yuan T. Lee
1997	Chang-Lin Tien
1996	Sanford H. Kadish Philip Selznick
1995	Frank H. T. Rhodes
1994	Daniel E. Koshland Jr.
1993	Ira Michael Heyman
1992	Henry Rosovsky Derek Bok Thomas E. Everhart
1991	Kenneth S. Pitzer Robert J. Brentano
1990	Edmund G. Brown Sr.
1989	J. William Fulbright
1988	Morrough P. O'Brien Lincoln Constance Ewald T. Grether Harry R. Wellman
1987	Robert E. Marshak
1986	Glenn T. Seaborg
1985	Lord Noel Gilroy Annan
1984	Sanford S. Elberg
1983	David Riesman
1982	Lynn White Jr.
1981	Richard W. Lyman
1980	Joel H. Hildebrand
1979	Choh-Ming Li
1977	James B. Conant
1976	Elinor Raas Heller
1974	John W. Gardner
1973	Theodore M. Hesburgh
1972	Earl Warren
1971	Roger W. Heyns
1970	Sir Eric Ashby
1969	J. E. Wallace Sterling
1968	Clark Kerr

== See also ==
- University of California, Berkeley
- List of prizes named after people
