= People's Park (Berkeley) =

Historic landmark in Berkeley, California

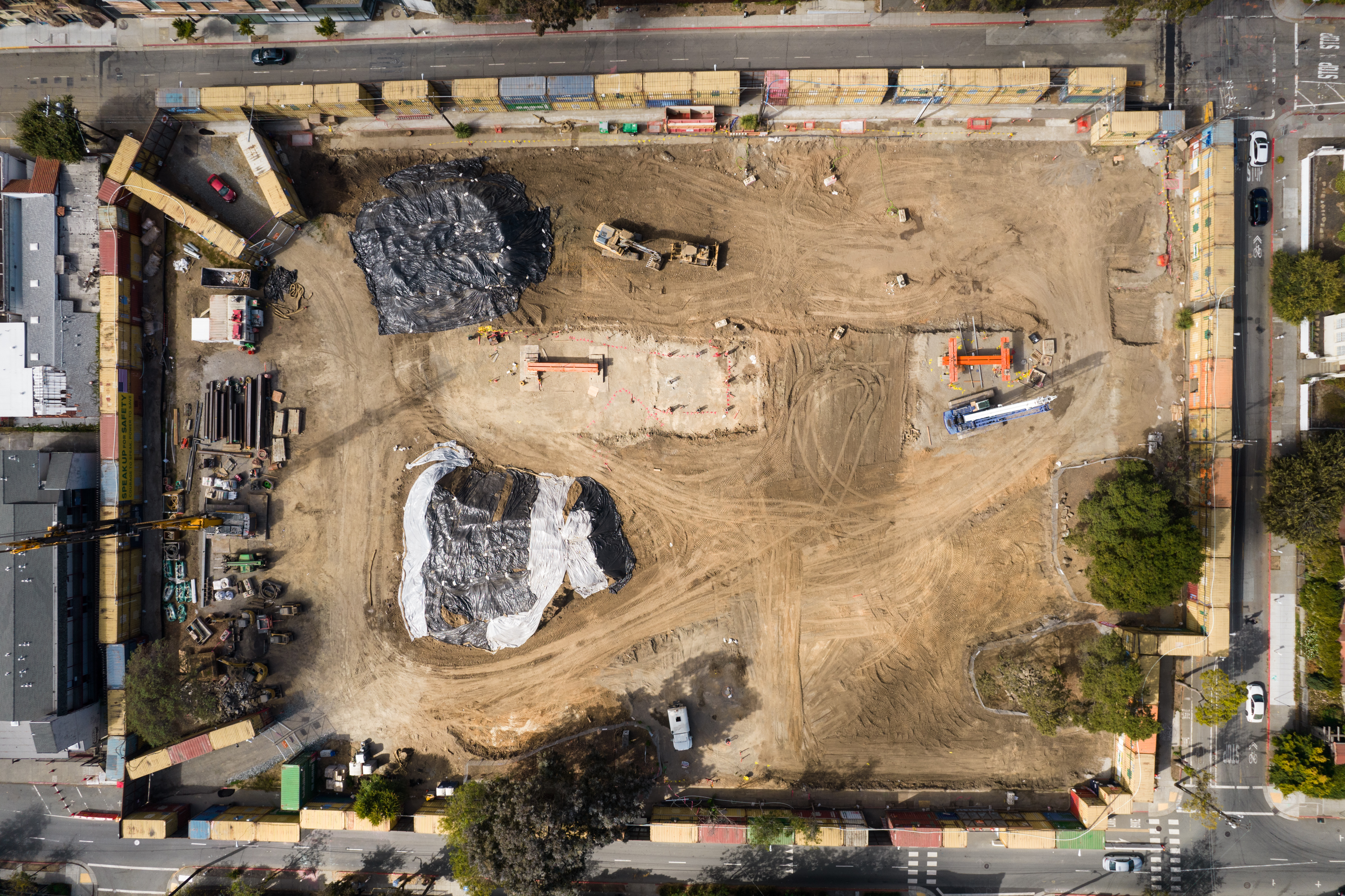
- Bird's-eye view of People's Park in 2024
- Interactive map of People's Park
- Type: Construction site, student housing
- Location: Berkeley, California, U.S.
- Coordinates: 37°51′56″N 122°15′25″W
- Area: 2.8 acres (1.1 ha)
- Closed: January 4, 2024
- Owner: University of California, Berkeley
- Status: Under construction
- People's Park
- U.S. National Register of Historic Places
- Berkeley Landmark
- NRHP reference No.: 100007288
- BERKL No.: 190

Significant dates
- Added to NRHP: May 31, 2022
- Designated BERKL: November 19, 1984

People's Park in Berkeley, California is a parcel of land owned by the University of California, Berkeley. Located east of Telegraph Avenue and bound by Haste and Bowditch Streets and Dwight Way, People's Park was a symbol during the radical political activism of the late 1960s. Formerly a park, the site is now under construction for new university student housing and homeless supportive housing.

While the land is owned by the University of California, People's Park was de facto established as a public park on April 20, 1969, by local activists. On May 13, University Chancellor Roger W. Heyns announced plans to construct a soccer field on the site, leading to a confrontation two days later between protesters and police on May 15. On a day known as "Bloody Thursday", police used tear gas and fired shotguns at the protesters to quell the riot, resulting notably in the death of James Rector. In 1984, the city of Berkeley declared it a historical and cultural landmark.

In 2018, the university published a plan to build 1,100 new units of student housing and 125 units of supportive housing for homeless people on the site, but a small contingent of activists delayed those plans through opposition including protests, lawsuits, sabotage of construction equipment, and trespassing on the site. The housing plans were backed by the Berkeley City Council, Mayor Jesse Arreguin, Berkeley's California Assembly representative Buffy Wicks and California Governor Gavin Newsom, and a majority of UC Berkeley students.

Pending a judgment in a legal challenge to the university's housing plan, the park was closed off in early January 2024, when construction workers and police surrounded the park with a 17-foot high wall of shipping containers to prevent trespassing. On June 6, the California Supreme Court unanimously ruled in the university's favor, allowing construction to proceed. Consequently, construction officially started on July 22.

== History ==
=== Early history ===
In 1956, the Regents of the University of California allocated a 2.8 acres (11,000 m^{2}) plot of land containing residences for future development into student housing, parking, and offices as part of the university's long range development plan. At the time, public funds were lacking to buy the land, and the plan was shelved until June 1967, when the university acquired $1.3 million to buy the land through eminent domain. The short-term goal was to create athletic fields with student housing being a longer-range goal.

Bulldozers arrived in February 1968 and began demolition of the residences. However, the university ran out of development funds, leaving the lot only partially cleared of demolition debris and rubble for 14 months.

On April 15, 1969, local boilermaker and activist Michael Delacour held a meeting with fellow political activists to discuss transforming the vacant lot into a community park. The idea quickly gained traction, and in the following days, the Berkeley Barb, a local underground newspaper, published a call to action for the creation of the park.

On Sunday, April 20, more than 100 people arrived at the site to begin building the park. Local landscape architect Jon Read and many others contributed trees, flowers, shrubs, and sod. Eventually, about 1,000 people became directly involved, with many more donating money and materials.

On May 13, Chancellor Roger W. Heyns notified the media via a press release that the university would build a fence around the property and begin construction.

=== 1969 protests and "Bloody Thursday" ===
In the early morning of Thursday, May 15, 1969, local police cleared the lot and arrested three people who refused to leave. University work crews arrived later and erected an 8-foot (2.4-metre) tall fence around the site. Beginning at noon, about 3,000 people appeared in Sproul Plaza at nearby UC Berkeley for a rally in favor of the park. The crowd later moved down Telegraph Avenue toward People's Park. Arriving in the early afternoon, protesters were met by the remaining 159 Berkeley and university police officers assigned to guard the fenced-off park site. A major confrontation ensued between police and the crowd, which grew to 4,000.

James Rector was watching from the roof of Granma Books when he was shot by police; he died on May 19. A carpenter, Alan Blanchard, was permanently blinded by a load of birdshot directly to his face. At least 128 Berkeley residents were admitted to local hospitals for head trauma, shotgun wounds, and other serious injuries inflicted by police.

That evening, Governor Ronald Reagan declared a state of emergency in Berkeley and sent in 2,700 National Guard troops. Demonstrations continued in Berkeley for several days after Bloody Thursday, and National Guard troops remained stationed there for two weeks.

=== Later history ===
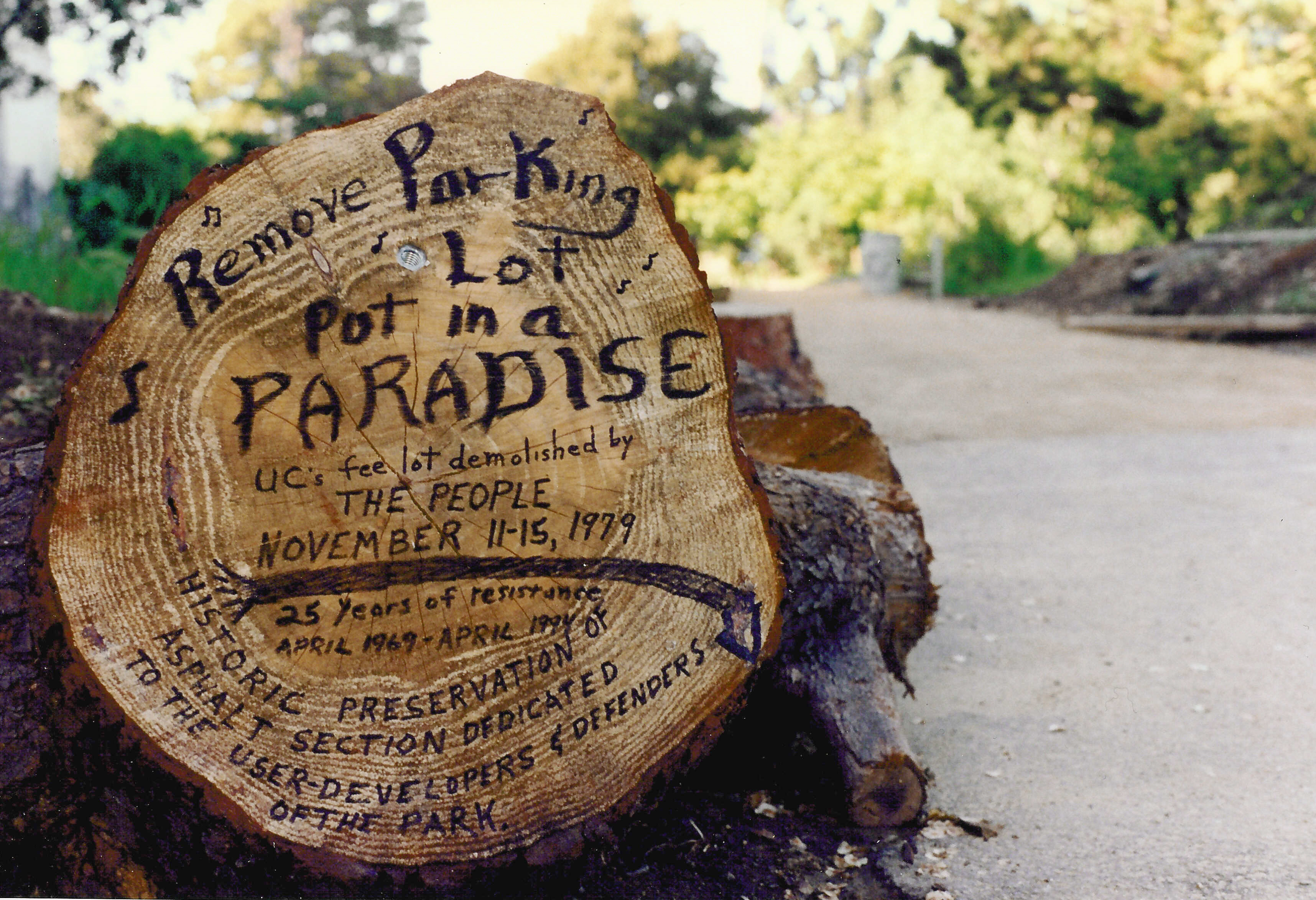
Unofficial memorial: 25 years of People's Park. "Remove parking lot, put in a paradise" is an allusion to Joni Mitchell's song "Big Yellow Taxi".

After the march in support of People's Park on May 30, 1969, the university decided to keep the 8-foot-tall perimeter chain-link wire fence and maintain a 24-hour guard over the site. On June 20, the University of California Regents voted to turn the People's Park site into a soccer field and parking lot, pending construction of apartments within a year. These plans never materialized. Efforts by the university to put in a soccer field in 1971 were met with resistance, with 44 people arrested during the protests. In 1979, protesters tore up a parking lot after the university paved over a part of the park for student parking.

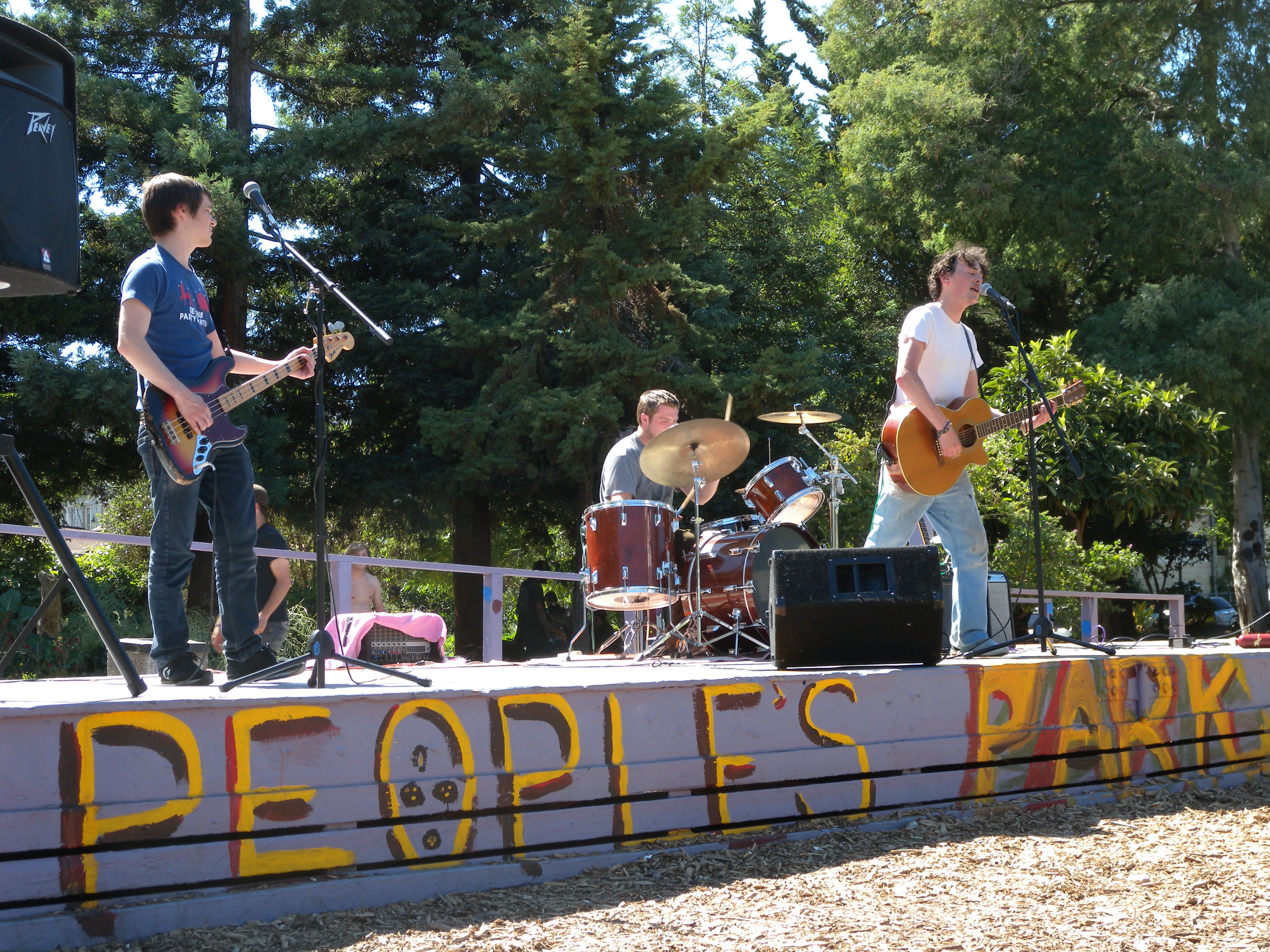
Dear Indugu on the People's Stage (2010)

=== Relation to Ohlone Park ===
In the immediate aftermath of the May 1969 demonstrations, and consistent with their goal of "letting a thousand parks bloom," on May 25, People's Park activists began gardening a two-block strip of land called the "Hearst Corridor," located adjacent to Hearst Avenue just northwest of the university campus. The Hearst Corridor was a strip of land along the north side of Hearst Avenue that had been left largely untended after the houses had been torn down to facilitate the completion of an underground subway line by the Bay Area Rapid Transit (BART) District. Initially slated for apartments, community outreach by a citizen's committee in 1974 revealed overwhelming support for the establishment of a public park, and the park was officially dedicated on June 7, 1979.

=== 1991 volleyball court controversy ===
In the spring of 1991, the university released plans to redevelop People's Park. They proposed removing the Free Speech Stage and installing several large volleyball courts throughout the park. Bulldozers were ushered in, accompanied by riot police, to install the sand volleyball courts, spurring a new wave of protests.

Protests grew each day, and police escalated to shooting wood pellets and rubber bullets at demonstrators. More than 104 people were arrested. The San Francisco Examiner later reported the cost to the university of installing one sand volleyball court to be $150,000, not including costs for security to defend the courts against protesters. The volleyball courts remained until 1997, however, when the university finally removed them from the park.

On August 25, 1992, Rosebud Denovo, who had been arrested or questioned more than a dozen times since 1991, broke into the basement of the residence of UC Berkeley Chancellor Chang-Lin Tien. Officers from the University of California Police Department (UCPD) responded to a silent alarm that had been triggered. Oakland Police Department (OPD) were called to assist. Refusing to surrender when called upon to do so by the responding officers, Denovo fled into the house. OPD police officers, with dogs, entered the house; after a brief encounter, an OPD officer shot and killed Denovo. Denovo was carrying a note demanding an end to the construction in People's Park; it read, in part: "We are willing to die for this piece of land. Are you?" Several protests over Denovo's death were made in the week following the shooting. Although the Office of the Alameda County District Attorney determined the police had acted appropriately in a report released in October, park activists and street people doubted the use of deadly force was justified.

=== 2000s to 2010s ===
In 2011, People's Park saw a new wave of protests, known as the "tree-sit", consisting of a series of individual "tree-sitters" who occupied a wooden platform in one of the trees in People's Park. These protests lasted throughout most of the fall of 2011, only ending when a protester fell out of a tree.

In late 2011, UC Berkeley bulldozed the west end of People's Park, in an effort to provide students and the broader community with safer, more sanitary conditions.

People's Park has been the subject of long-running contention between those who see it as a haven for criminals that is unfriendly to visitors and families, and those who see it as an essential green space south of campus and a memorial to the Free Speech Movement. While the site had public bathrooms, gardens, and a playground area, many residents do not see it as a welcoming place, citing drug use and a high crime rate. A San Francisco Chronicle article on January 13, 2008, referred to People's Park as "a forlorn and somewhat menacing hub for drug users and the homeless." The same article quoted denizens and supporters of the park saying it was "perfectly safe, clean and accessible." In May 2018, UC Berkeley reported that campus police had been called 1,585 times to People's Park in the previous year. The university also said there had been 10,102 criminal incidents in the park between 2012 and 2017. A 2015 investigation by the Daily Californian found that most crimes reported at People's Park were related to "quality-of-life" such as drug and alcohol violations, and disorderly conduct, but that there were also multiple reports of assault, battery, aggravated theft, and robbery at the park.

== Redevelopment and controversy (since 2018) ==
In 2018, UC Berkeley unveiled a plan for People's Park that would include the construction of housing for as many as 1,000 students, supportive housing for the homeless or military veterans, and a memorial honoring the park's history and legacy. In November 2018, Rigel Robinson was elected to the Berkeley City Council for District 7, which includes People's Park, campaigning on his support for developing housing at People's Park.

On August 29, 2019, Chancellor Carol T. Christ confirmed plans to create student housing for 600–1000 students, and supportive housing for 100–125 people. San Francisco-based LMS architects were selected to build the housing, and Christ stated that the university was moving to a time of "extensive public comment" on the plans for construction.

In February 2020, Berkeley City Councilmembers Rigel Robinson and Lori Droste and Berkeley Mayor Jesse Arreguin published their support for developing permanent supportive housing and student housing on the site in an SF Chronicle opinion. That month, on February 10, the university held its first public comment forum. Advocates of the park held a rally to protest the proposal, with students citing the historical, cultural, and social relevance of the park.

On April 17, 2020, UC Berkeley published its plans for the People's Park Housing Project during its third virtual open house. Because of the COVID-19 pandemic, and the following shelter-in-place ordinances, the university moving forward with the plan was faced with significant backlash. The mayor of Berkeley, Jesse Arreguín, wrote "I think we should launch this process at a time and in a way that allows full transparency and participation. I therefore reiterate my request that the campus delay the public comment period until after the Shelter in Place order is lifted."

On April 29, 2020, the Associated Students of the University of California (ASUC), planned to vote on re-establishing the nonpartisan housing commission.

=== 2021 occupation ===
In January 2021, UC Berkeley erected fences around portions of People's Park to take core samples of the soil composition in preparation for construction. Homeless people who had set up tents in the park during the COVID-19 pandemic were removed from the site by UC police. In response, a rally was organized on January 29. Michael Delacour, one of the founders of the park, gave a speech expressing frustration. Spurred on by his words, hundreds of people broke down construction equipment, tore down the fences, and carried them down Telegraph Avenue. Some were deposited on the front steps of Sproul Hall, the UC Berkeley administration building.

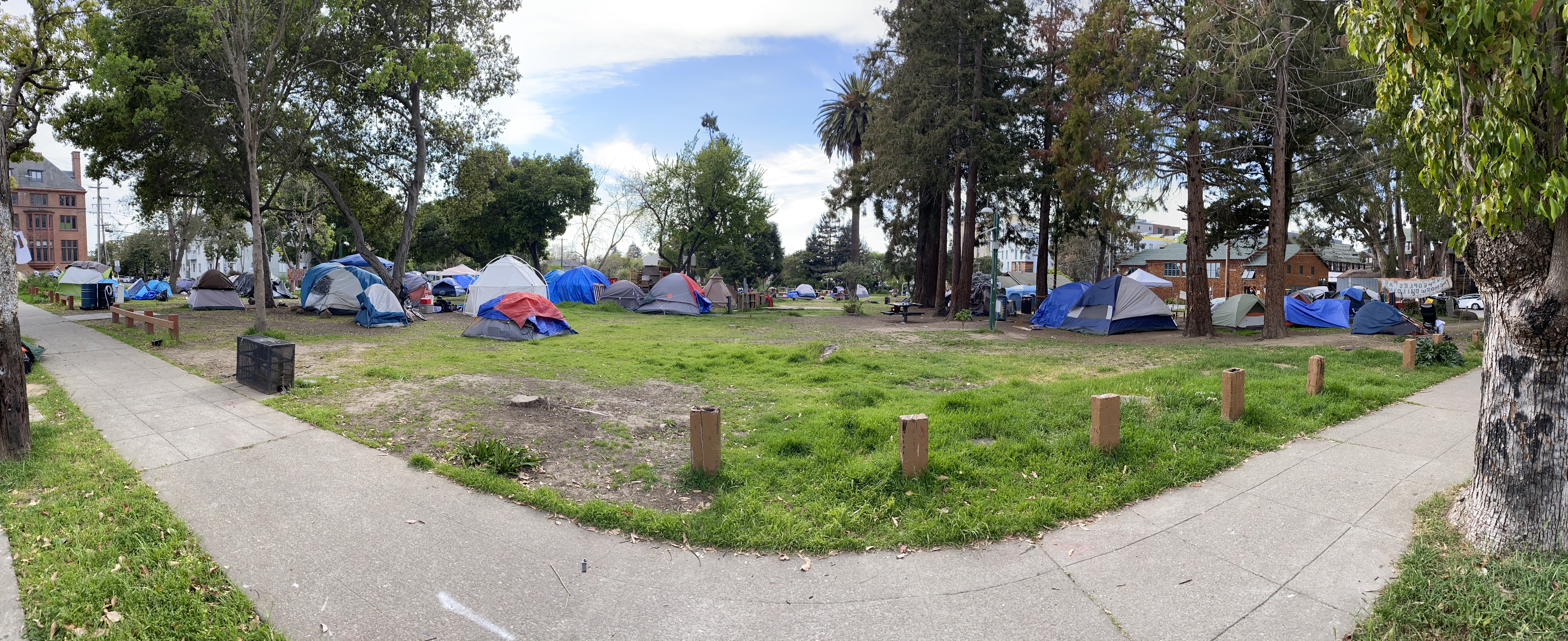
The park with homeless people's tents in April 2021.

Protesters, including some UC Berkeley students, occupied the park in February 2021 to call for an immediate halt of development plans and evictions of current residents of the park, citing police mistreatment of the homeless' belongings. A university spokesman said that he was unaware of any reports of police throwing away those belongings.

In a statement issued shortly after the occupation began, UC Berkeley Chancellor Carol Christ described building on the park as a "a unique opportunity for a win-win-win-win."

=== National historical recognition ===
People's Park was officially listed on the National Register of Historic Places on May 24, 2022.

=== 2022 demolition effort ===
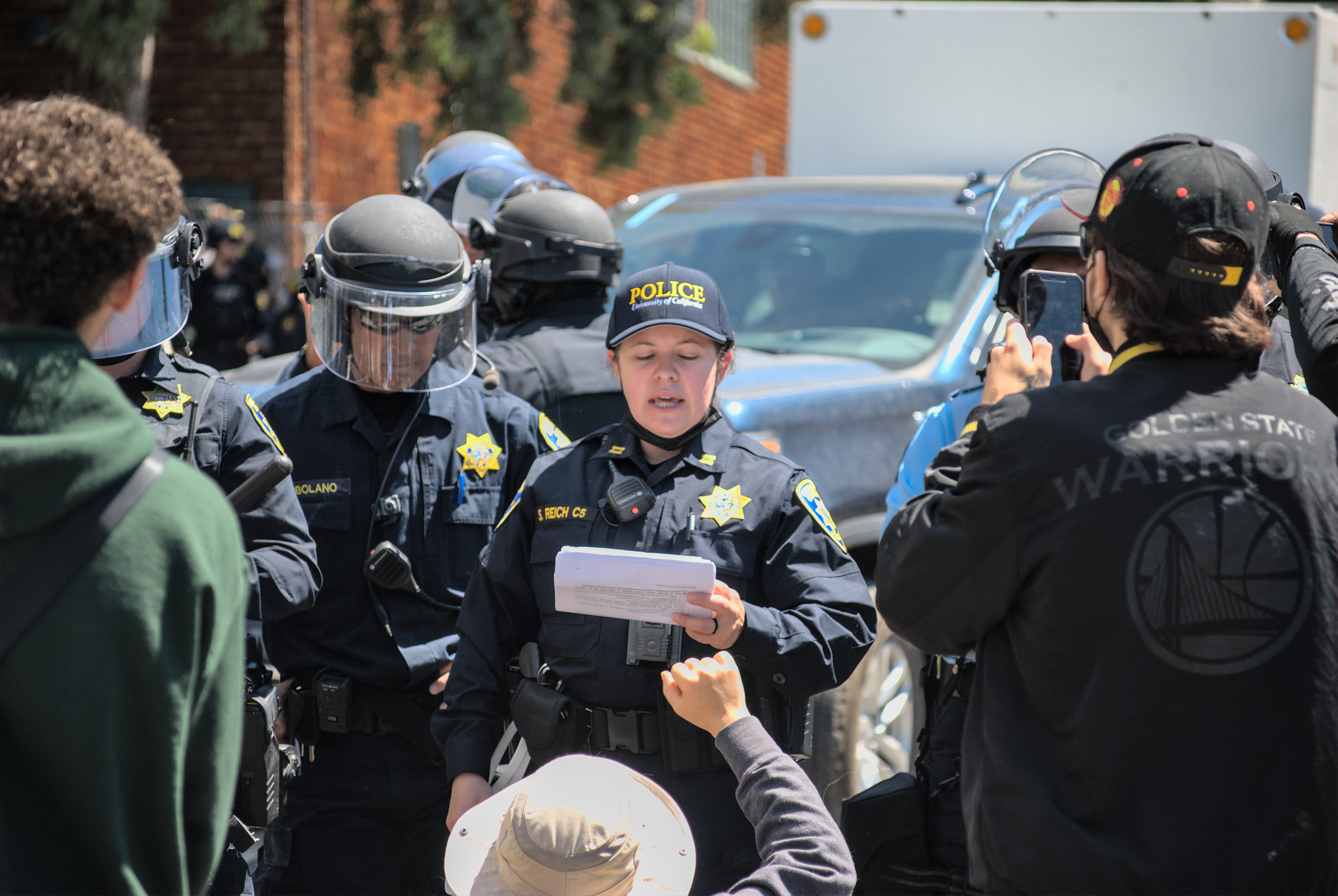
Protesters and police face off at a barricade near People's Park on August 3, 2022.

Just after midnight on August 3, 2022, the UC Berkeley Police Department and contractors began fencing off People's Park. Protesters gathered after multiple "bulldozer" alerts were shared when workers began unloading heavy machinery and construction equipment into the park. At about 3 a.m., activists tried to block the movement of machinery into the park by lying on the road, and arrests were made. By noon, 47 trees in People's Park were cut down by a local company.

These events were accompanied by a protest at Sproul Plaza on the UC Berkeley campus. Demonstrators marched down Telegraph Avenue and Haste Street, coalescing at the park. By noon, the university decided to withdraw construction crews from the site, citing "destruction of construction materials, unlawful protest activities and violence on the part of some." Hours later, the university announced that construction work at People's Park would be temporarily paused.

On August 4, a special City Council meeting was canceled by Mayor Jesse Arreguín. The meeting was scheduled a day after confrontations with law enforcement occurred, in order to discuss lifting Berkeley's ban on the use of tear gas and pepper spray by police. The June 2020 ban was put in place by a unanimous vote, with Arreguín saying at the time that tear gas "is banned in warfare and should not be used on our streets or in protests." The mayor said he initially called for the August 4 meeting following the protests at People's Park, but later said that he "came to the conclusion that it was the wrong approach and that the ban on tear gas should remain." The mayor stated that he supports the university's housing project, but said that "it’s understandable that people are very concerned and upset about the construction at the park" and that there is a need to "make sure that people can protest peacefully, and make sure we are protecting the safety of the broader community at the same time."

On August 5, the California First District Court of Appeal upheld a stay on construction, demolition and tree-cutting, temporarily pausing further development work at People's Park until the legal issue was resolved. The university, however, retained and enforced its legal right to fence the perimeter of the park.

=== 2024 fencing ===
January 2024

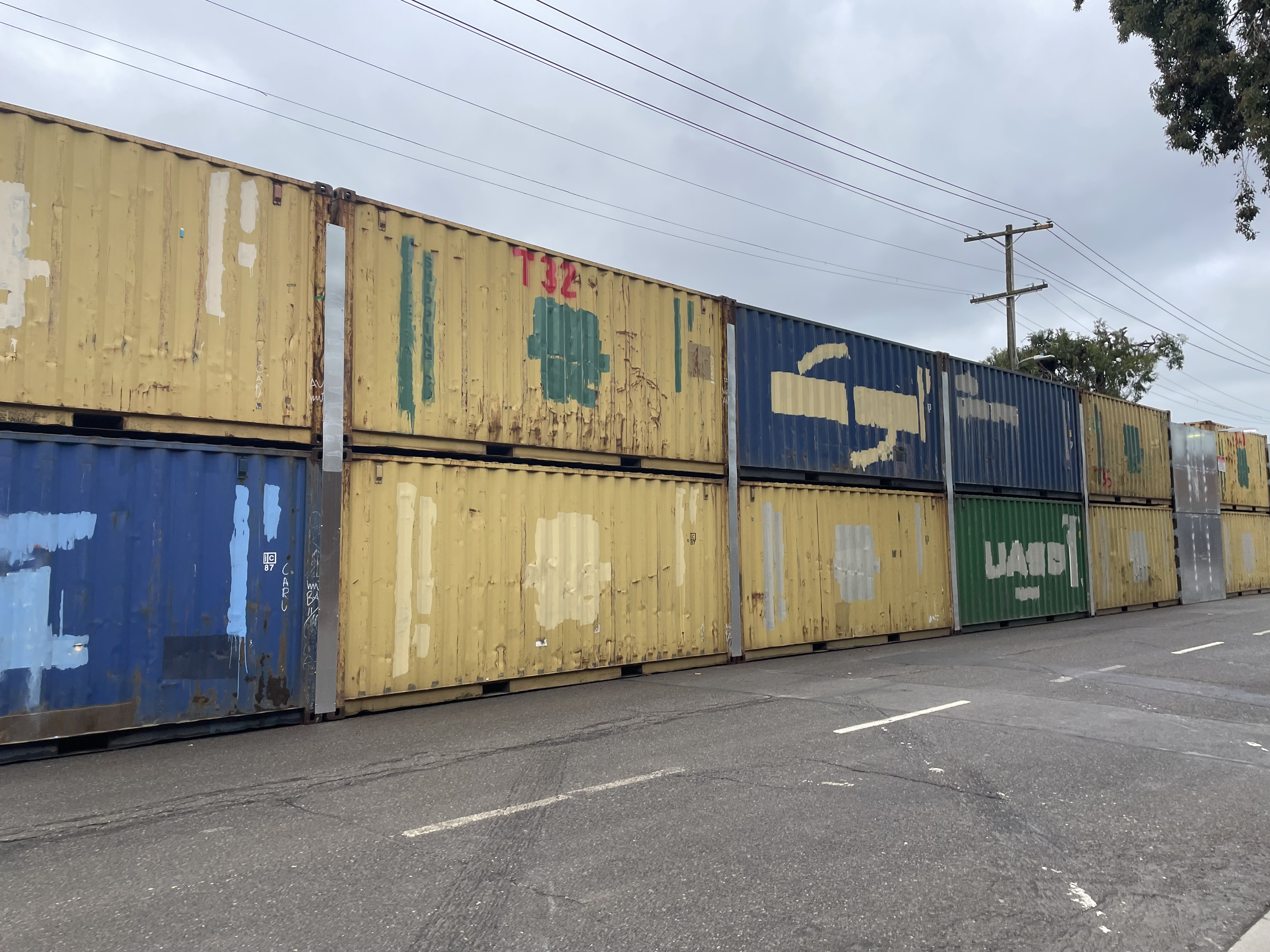
Shipping containers surrounding People's Park

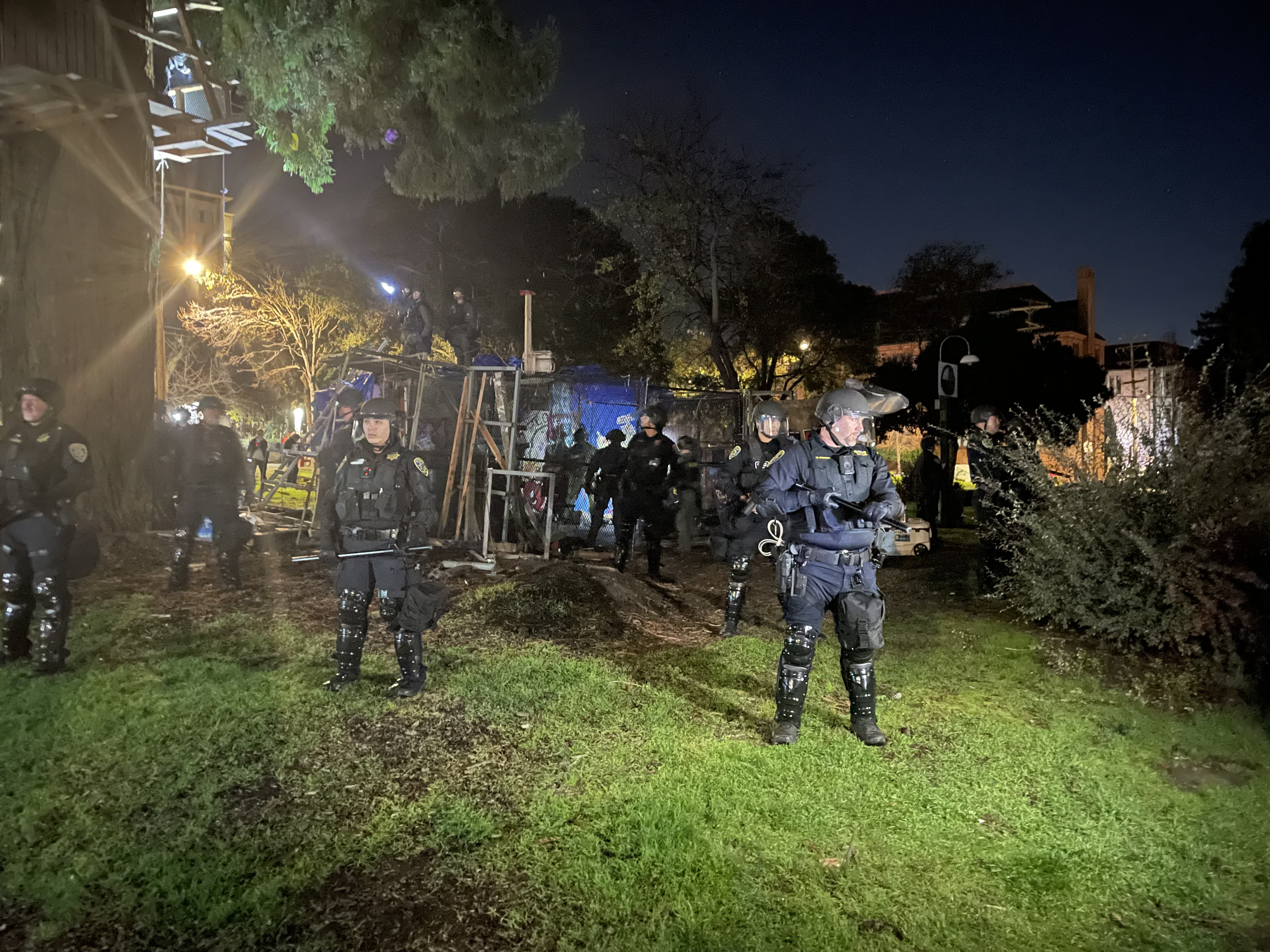
Police enclose the park after midnight on January 4, 2024.

On January 4, 2024, shortly after midnight, UC Berkeley fenced off the park's perimeter with double-stacked intermodal containers in an action that involved at least 100 police officers from UCPD, Cal State campus police, California Highway Patrol, and the Alameda County Sheriff's Office. About 60 protesters occupied the park during the overnight operation until forced to leave by police, which led to seven arrests. The university was not allowed to start construction on its proposed development due to the ongoing court case, but took measures to fully secure the perimeter of the lot, as several large trees were also chopped down.

On the previous night, park advocates had held an overnight vigil to defend against rumored fencing, expressing concern that UC Berkeley's winter break meant that many students were not around. In a press release, UC Berkeley stated that the park was being closed to "minimize disruption for the city of Berkeley and campus communities".

Within a week after setting up the containers, UC Berkeley added razor wire along their tops to prevent protesters from climbing onto or over them.

=== 2024 California Supreme Court decision ===
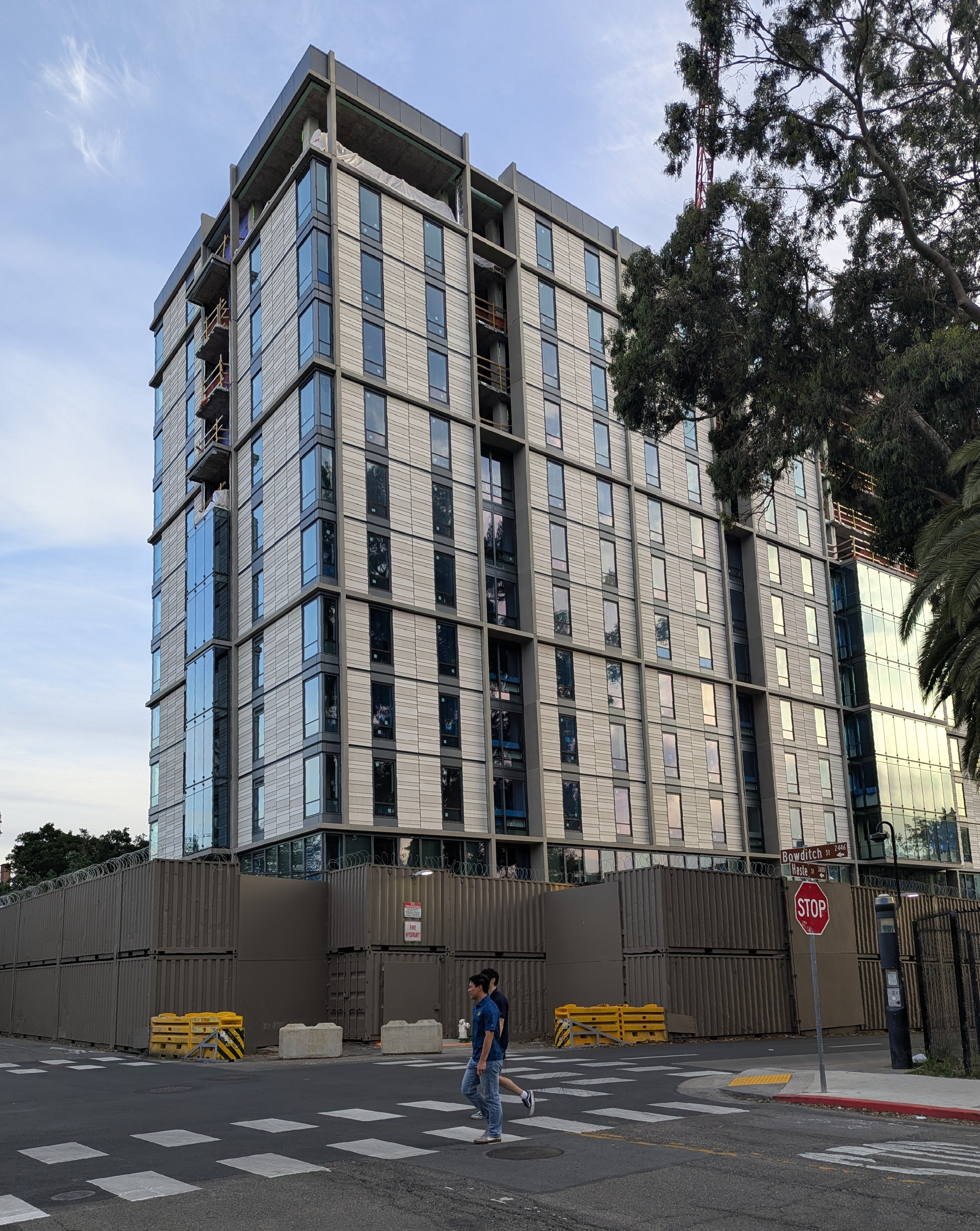
Judith E. Heumann House nearly complete behind intermodal container fencing (Apr 2026)

On June 6, 2024, the California Supreme Court unanimously sided with the university in an appeal to begin construction on the site. UC Berkeley announced after the ruling that it would be preparing a plan to start construction of student housing at the site, and subsequently began on July 22.

== See also ==
- 1960s Berkeley protests
- Earth Peoples Park
- Guerrilla gardening
- Rosebud Denovo
- South Central Farm
