= Albert H. Bowker =

Albert Hosmer Bowker

5th Chancellor of the University of California, Berkeley
- In office 1971–1980
- Preceded by: Roger W. Heyns
- Succeeded by: Ira Michael Heyman

2nd Chancellor of the City University of New York
- In office 1963–1971
- Preceded by: John Rutherford Everett
- Succeeded by: Robert Kibbee

Personal details
- Born: September 8, 1919 Winchendon, Massachusetts
- Died: January 20, 2008 (aged 88) Portola Valley, California

Academic background
- Education: Massachusetts Institute of Technology; Columbia University

Academic work
- Discipline: Statistics
- Institutions: Stanford University; City University of New York; University of California, Berkeley; University of Maryland

Albert Hosmer Bowker (September 8, 1919 – January 20, 2008) was an American statistician and university administrator. Born in Massachusetts, he began his career at Stanford University in the late 1940s where he worked until the early 1950s. In 1953, he was elected a Fellow of the American Statistical Association. He then served as Chancellor of the City University of New York from 1963 to 1971. During this period, in 1964, he married his second wife, Rosedith Sitgreaves, a notable statistician who had gone through the graduate program in statistics at Columbia University with Bowker and was at the time a professor at Columbia. He went on to serve as Chancellor of the University of California, Berkeley from 1971 to 1980, followed by a stint as U.S. Assistant Secretary for Post-Secondary Education in the Carter administration. Afterward, he became Dean of the School of Public Affairs at the University of Maryland. He died of pancreatic cancer in 2008.

== Early life and education ==
Bowker was born on September 8, 1919, in Winchendon, Massachusetts. He attended the Massachusetts Institute of Technology where he received a B.S. in mathematics and later went to Columbia University where he received a Ph.D. in statistics.

Academic offices
Preceded by John Rutherford Everett	Chancellor of the City University of New York; 1963 – 1971	Succeeded by Robert Joseph Kibbee
Preceded by Roger W. Heyns	Chancellor of the University of California, Berkeley; 1971 – 1980	Succeeded by Ira Michael Heyman
