= Benjamin Ide Wheeler =

American linguist and president of the University of California

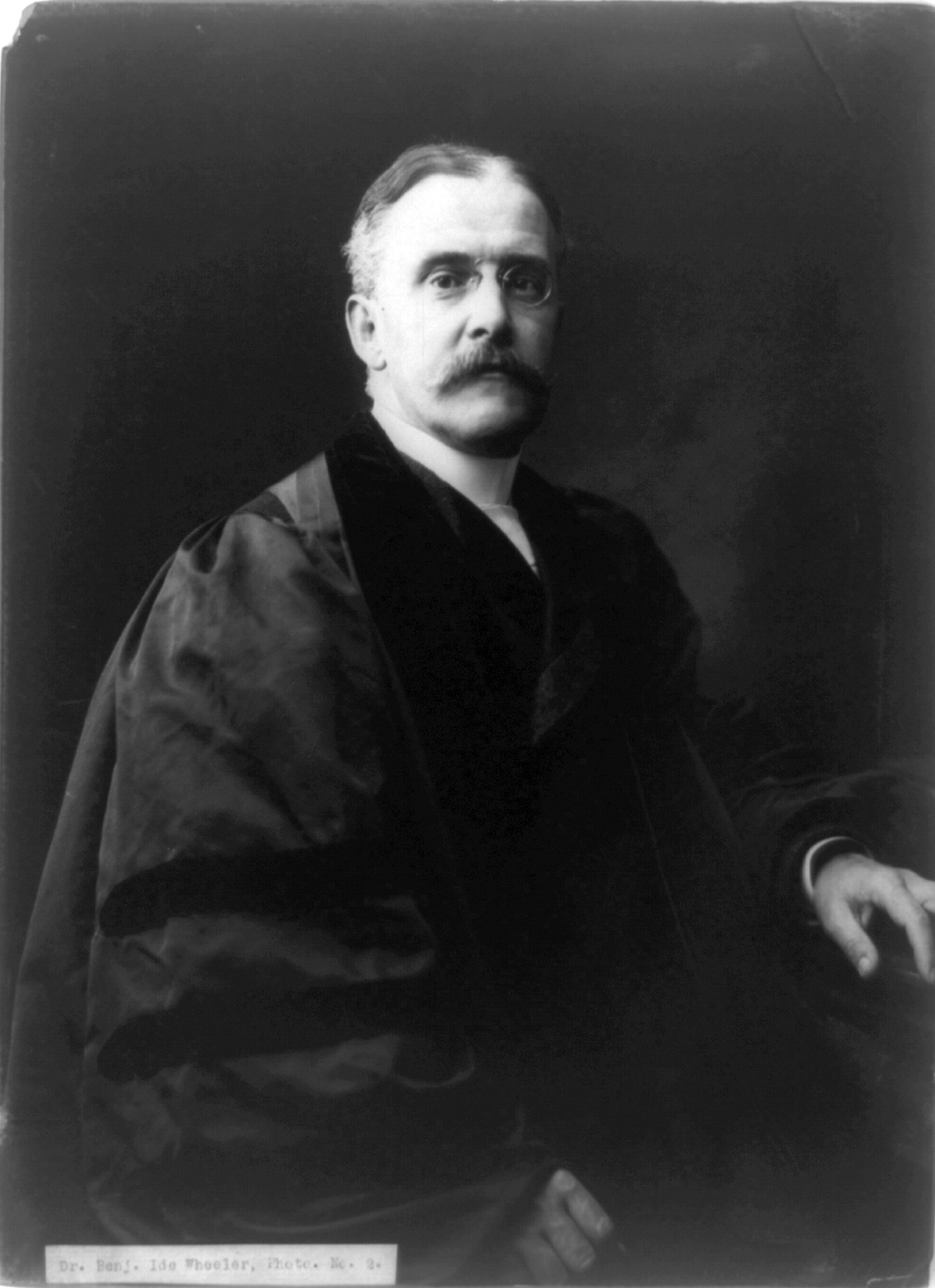
Benjamin Ide Wheeler, 1899

Benjamin Ide Wheeler (July 15, 1854– May 2, 1927) was a professor of Greek and comparative philology at Cornell University, writer, and President of the University of California from 1899 to 1919.

== Life and career ==
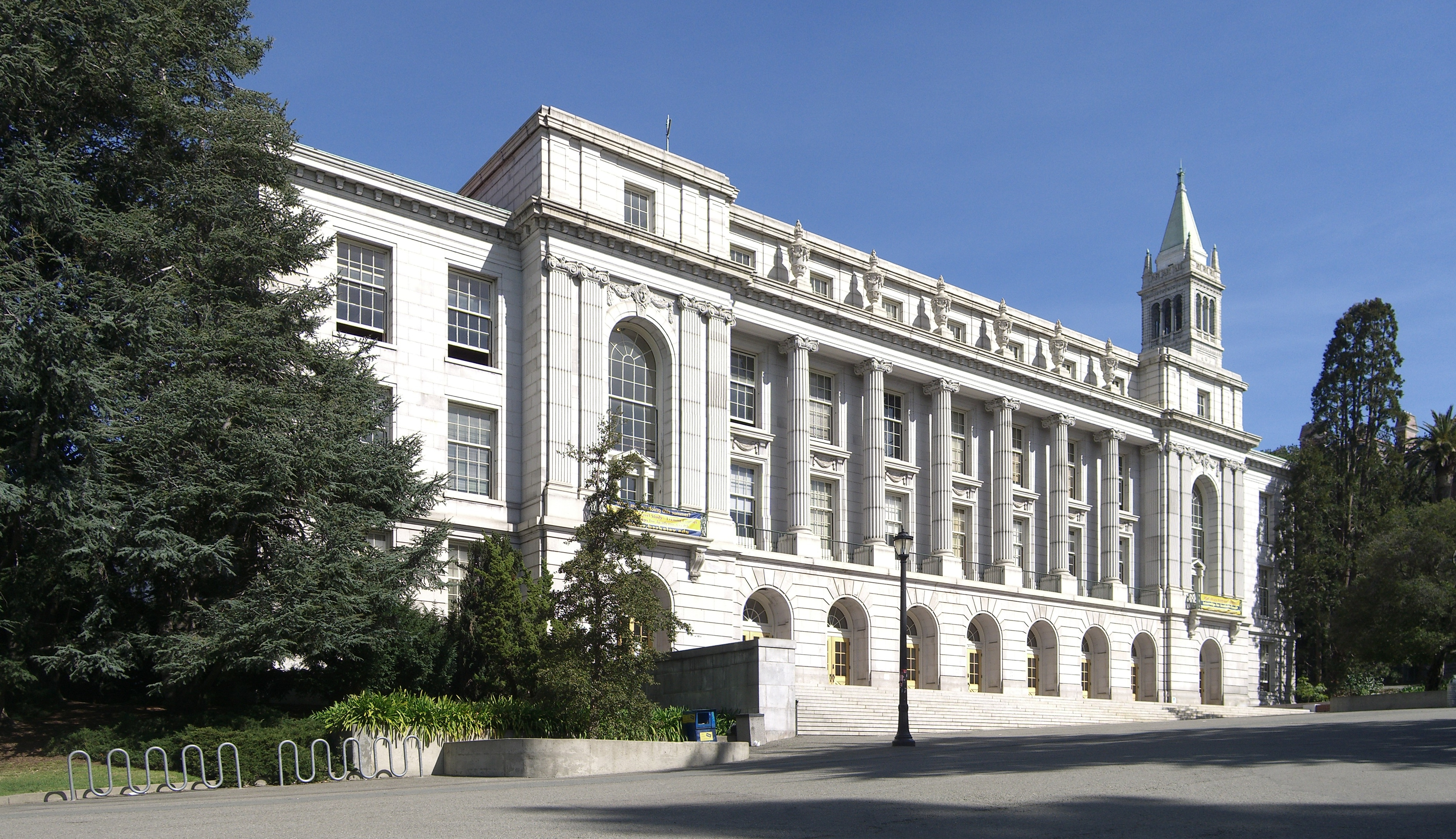
Wheeler Hall at the University of California, Berkeley

=== Early years ===
Benjamin Ide Wheeler was born in Randolph, Massachusetts, on July 15, 1854, the son of the Rev. Benjamin and Mary Eliza (Ide) Wheeler. His father was successively a church pastor in Plaistow, New Hampshire; Pawtucket, Rhode Island; Randolph, Massachusetts; Haverhill, Massachusetts; Saco, Maine; Franklin, New Hampshire. His mother, Mary Eliza Ide, was born in Pawtucket, Rhode Island, daughter of Ebenezer Ide of the Ide family which had its origin in South Attleborough, then Rehoboth. Their only son, Benjamin Ide Wheeler, had his education first in the public schools of Haverhill and Saco, Maine. It was at Saco that he first entered a high school in 1866. This high school was the institution which formerly had been called Thornton Academy, and subsequently resumed that name.

=== Higher education ===
On moving in 1868 to Franklin, New Hampshire, he entered the Franklin Academy, and after six months there, went to the New London Academy, subsequently Colby–Sawyer College. From this school he was duly graduated in the summer of 1871. In the following autumn he entered Brown University where he was a member of the Brunonian chapter of the Alpha Delta Phi Fraternity. He graduated from Brown University in 1875. His studies at college followed the usual curriculum without any suggestion of specialization. On the commencement stage he had the honour of the classical oration. During his college course he received the Dunn premium, given for the best work of the year in the department of English, with special reference to writing and speaking, and also one of the Carpenter prizes given to the two students of the year who in the opinion of the faculty combined in the highest degree the elements of success in life.

=== Teaching career ===
After graduation, Wheeler taught for four years in the Providence High School. During the first two years, he instructed mostly in mathematics; during the last two year, his work was evenly divided between classics and mathematics. In 1879, he was appointed Tutor in Brown University to take the place, during a temporary absence of two years, of Professor Poland, Assistant Professor in Greek and Latin.

=== Marriage ===
On June 25, 1881, Wheeler married Amey Webb of Providence, Rhode Island. She was the daughter of Henry Aborn Webb, a banker of Providence. Her mother, Amey Gorham Webb, was the daughter of Jabez Gorham founder of Gorham Silver, that became Gorham Silver Manufacturing Company after his son John Gorham took over.

== Studies abroad ==
For four years, 1881–85, Wheeler studied in German universities—for a year at Leipzig, (Note: Benjamin Ide Wheeler ; Date of enrollment: 10 November 1881 ; Registration number: 176 ; Place of birth: Randolph, Massachusetts ; Birth and death: 15 July 1854 – 2 May 1927 ; Religion: Protestant ; Father's profession: Pastor (Baptist minister) ; Education: A.B., Brown University (1875); A.M., Brown University (1878); Ph.D., Heidelberg (1885) ; Field of studies: Philology ; Career: 1876–1880? Teacher, Providence High School; 1879–1881, Instructor in Latin and Greek, Brown University; 1885–1886, Instructor in German, Harvard University; 1886–1899, Professor of Comparative Philology, Cornell University; 1892–1926, Member of Managing Committee; 1895–1896, Professor of Greek, American School of Classical Studies, Athens, Greece; 1899–1919, President, University of California; 1909, Theodore Roosevelt Professor, Berlin. ; Miscellaneous: At Leipzig with his wife, Amey Webb. ; Sources: ANB, pp. 128–130; Faculty Biographical File; Quinquennial, pp. 155, 1183; Lord, p. 359.) then for two years at Heidelberg, a half year at Jena, and a half year at Berlin. In the spring of 1885, he received on examination at Heidelberg the degree of Doctor of Philosophy, summa cum laude, presenting a thesis under Hermann Osthoff entitled Der griechische Nominalaccent, afterwards published at Strassburg as a separate book. The thesis led to what is known as the law of dactylic retraction or "Wheeler's Law". Joseph Wright, future Corpus Christi Professor of Comparative Philology at Oxford, completed his PhD the same year as Wheeler and also writing his thesis under Osthoff.

=== Return to America ===
On returning to America he was for one year Instructor at Harvard, 1885–86, then for thirteen years Professor at Cornell University, holding at first the title Acting Professor of Classical Philology, 1886–87, then of Professor of Comparative Philology 1887–88, and from 1888 to 1899 that of Professor of Greek and Comparative Philology. In 1899, he became President of the University of California.

During the year 1895–96, he was Professor of Greek Literature at the American School of Classical Studies in Athens, and during the year 1909–10, Roosevelt Professor at the University of Berlin. He was member of the American Oriental Society, the American Philological Association, and the Kaiserliches Archaeologisches Institut. He received the degree of Doctor of Laws from nine different universities, Princeton, 1896; Harvard, 1900; Brown, 1900; Yale, 1901; Johns Hopkins, 1902; University of Wisconsin, 1904; Dartmouth, 1905; Columbia, 1906; and a degree of Doctor of Letters from the University of Athens in Greece.

During the 1906 San Francisco earthquake and fire he was a member of Mayor Eugene Schmitz's Committee of Fifty.

During World War I his "well-known German sympathies and admiration for the kaiser" brought suspicion upon him and he retired as President of the University of California after the armistice. Wheeler had previously nominated the kaiser for the Nobel Peace Prize.

Under Wheeler the University of California underwent one of its periods of greatest growth. He also expanded the powers of the president, gaining the power to appoint all faculty.

== Legacy ==
- The University of California, Berkeley named Wheeler Hall in his honor.
- The Liberty ship SS Benjamin Ide Wheeler was named in his honor.
- The Benjamin Ide Wheeler Medal was created in 1929.
- Founding member of the Commonwealth Club of California in 1903.

=== Benjamin Ide Wheeler Medal ===
Since 1929, the award has been given to members of the community of Berkeley for exhibited outstanding contributions. Since 1994, the Berkeley Community Fund has been granting "Berkeley's Most Useful Citizen" award. Until 1991, it was bi-annual but changed to annual in 1994. Several notable people have received the award:

- 1929 William H. Waste
- 1931 August Vollmer
- 1933 Robert Gordon Sproul
- 1935 Chester R. Rowell
- 1937 William B. Herms
- 1939 Monroe E. Deutsch
- 1941 Louise Marks
- 1943 Lester W. Hink
- 1945 E.O. Lawrence
- 1947 Vere V. Loper
- 1949 Emery Stone
- 1951 Clarence A. Bullwinkel
- 1953 Galen M. Fisher
- 1955 Walter A. Gordon
- 1957 Lilly M. Whitaker
- 1959 Robert R. Porter
- 1961 Redmond C. Staats, Jr.
- 1963 Claude B. Hutchison
- 1965 Katherine Towle
- 1967 Wallace J.S. Johnson
- 1969 Roger W. Heyns
- 1971 Wilmont Sweeny
- 1973 Carol Sibley
- 1975 Thomas B. Shaw
- 1977 Sylvia C. McLaughlin
- 1979 Robert W. Ratcliff
- 1981 Paul E. Harberts
- 1983 Robert G. Eaneman
- 1985 Robert A. Rice
- 1987 Margaret S. Gordon
- 1989 Fred S. Stripp
- 1991 Mary Lee Jefferds
- 1994 Ira Michael Heyman
- 1995 Alba and Bernard Witkin
- 1996 John A. Martin, Jr.
- 1997 Chang-Lin Tien
- 1998 David R. Brower
- 1999 Marian Cleeves Diamond
- 2000 Thelton E. Henderson
- 2001 Jeffrey Shattuck Leiter
- 2002 Alice Waters
- 2003 Kent Nagano
- 2004 Arthur Rosenfeld, Ph.D.
- 2005 Davida Coady, M.D.
- 2006 Mal Warwick
- 2007 Robert Cole
- 2008 Helen Meyer
- 2008 John Meyer
- 2009 Steven H. Oliver
- 2010 Denny Abrams
- 2010 Richard Millikan
- 2011 Narsai M. David
- 2012 Susan Medak
- 2013 Wavy Gravy
- 2014 Arlene Blum
- 2015 Archana Horsting
- 2016 Skip Battle
- 2017 Vicki Alexander
- 2018 Susan Muscarella
- 2019 Frances Dinkelspiel, Lance Knobel and Tracey Taylor

== Works ==
Wheeler authored Analogy in Language (1887); Introduction to the Study of the History of Language (1890); Organization of the Higher Education in the United States (1896), published in Munich; Dionysos and Immortality (1899); Life of Alexander the Great (1900); Instruction and Democracy in America (1910) (published in Strassburg, Germany).

=== Articles ===
A commencement address at the University of Michigan titled The old world in the new, an address delivered at the commencement exercises of the University of Michigan, June 30, 1898, was published in the August 1898 issue of The Atlantic and Art in Language was published in the December 1900 issue.

== Publications ==
- Der griechische Nominalaccent (1885)
- Analogy, and the Scope of its Application in Language (1887)
- Principles of Language Growth (1891)
- Introduction to the Study of the History of Language (1891)
- The Organization of Higher Education in the United States (1897)
- Dionysos and Immortality (the Ingersoll Lecture for 1898)
- Alexander the Great: The Merging of East and West in Universal History (1900)
- The Whence and Whither of the Modern Science of Language (1905)

== Notes ==
Academic offices
| Preceded by Martin Kellogg | President of the University of California; 1899–1919 | Succeeded by David Prescott Barrows |
