= Rosebud Denovo =

American burglar and squatter

- Born: Laura Marie Miller; August 10, 1973
- Died: August 25, 1992 (aged 19); University House, campus of UC Berkeley
- Resting place: Lexington Cemetery

Rosebud Abigail Denovo (born Laura Marie Miller, August 10, 1973 – August 25, 1992) was an activist who was killed by police after she broke into University House, the on-campus home of the Chancellor at the University of California, Berkeley.

== Early life ==
Denovo was committed to a mental hospital by her parents when she was 14 after a history of discipline issues in school, and was released after 10 months of treatment. She was again confined in 1989, but escaped in September 1990 and hitchhiked to Berkeley by late 1990 via Portland, Oregon.

At one point, Denovo was squatting in a house at 2628 Regent Street in Berkeley; coincidentally, the cottage (at 2628A Regent) behind it was where Theodore Kaczynski lived in 1968 while teaching mathematics at Berkeley from 1968–69. Other sources claim Denovo lived in the cottage, not the house.

== Criminal activities ==
In July and August 1991, protests erupted at People's Park in Berkeley, California over the construction of beach volleyball courts on the site; although the site belonged to the University, it had remained vacant since the Bloody Thursday riot of May 15, 1969, after it had been cleared in 1968 for student housing that was never built.

Denovo had been involved in those 1991 riots, leading to her arrest that summer for trespassing and vandalism on campus property, and for carrying concealed weapons and attacking police officers at the People's Park protests. On July 31, 1991, Denovo, her boyfriend, and a transient they had befriended were arrested while hiding in bushes near University House, the Chancellor's residence. They were cited for prowling and released; according to the transient, they had gone to "find the chancellor's house to see how to get inside it to blow it up."

After Denovo was arrested again on August 8, 1991, police searched a campsite where she was living with a boyfriend in the Berkeley hills, and discovered explosive devices and a list of potential targets, including several university officials. The couple also possessed crossbows, arrows, a copy of The Anarchist Cookbook (which contains instructions for making homemade bombs), and a journal tied to her that made threatening references to Chancellor Tien. According to the San Francisco Chronicle, a diary entry dated June 25, 1991 read "Tien, you're not getting off that easy. Man, I want to destroy something."

Her trial was pending on the 1991 explosives possession charges at the time of her death. In total, Denovo had been arrested or questioned more than a dozen times in the year prior to her death.

=== Break-in and death ===
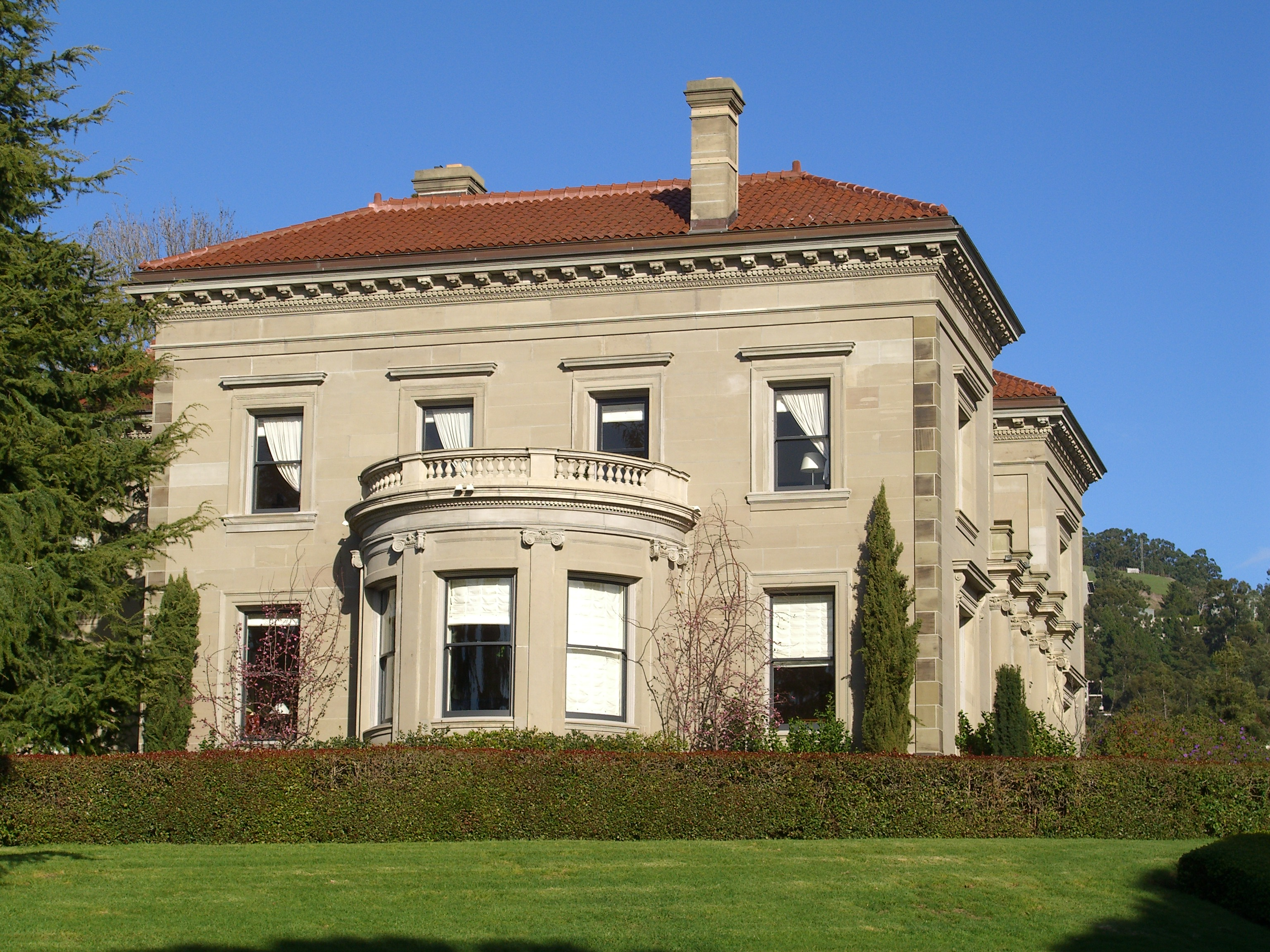
University House (2006)

On August 25, 1992, Denovo broke into the basement of University House, the residence of Chancellor Chang-Lin Tien on the UC Berkeley campus at 5:51 am, using a blow torch to cut through bars securing a window. This triggered a silent alarm that summoned the University of California Police Department (UCPD); while enroute, the UCPD woke the Chancellor and his wife with a phone call, warning them to lock their bedroom door. Onsite, officers from the UCPD and the Oakland Police Department (OPD) spotted Denovo through a window and demanded she surrender; she fled into the house instead. The OPD had been called in to assist.

After the responding officers escorted Tien and his wife safely off the premises, OPD police officers with dogs entered the house; after a brief encounter, an OPD officer shot and killed Denovo. Denovo was carrying a note demanding an end to the construction in People's Park; it read, in part: "We are willing to die for this piece of land. Are you?"

According to UCPD Chief Victoria Harrison, canine patrol officer Craig Chew of the OPD shot Denovo three times in self-defense after she allegedly lunged at Chew with a machete. Chew had previously been shot five times in July 1991 by a teenage robbery suspect during an investigation in Temescal, and had just returned to duty in July 1992. In addition, Chew had been investigated three times in 1989 for the use of excessive force during his tenure with the Berkeley Police Department, where he served prior to joining the OPD in 1990.

== Legacy ==
Several protests over Denovo's death were made in the week following the shooting. According to her parents, who had come to visit Denovo in July 1992, she had been planning to enroll at Berkeley. Although the Office of the Alameda County District Attorney determined the police had acted appropriately in a report released in October, park activists and street people doubted the use of deadly force was justified. According to the autopsy report, Denovo was shot at least once in the back; UCPD Chief Victoria Harrison theorized that Denovo may have continued to twist around after she swung the machete at Officer Chew, presenting her back during that shot.

The city of Berkeley began to renovate People's Park in 1995, following a resolution to ensure cooperation with the University that unanimously passed the city council. The volleyball courts at People's Park were removed in 1997. That year, Steven Starr and Patrick Dillon completed their screenplay for a film entitled A.K.A. Rosebud; Natalie Portman and Monica Keena performed read-throughs (Keena, at the Nuyorican Poets Café) for the lead role. A copy of the synopsis and research for the screenplay is held in the Amos Poe Papers collection of the Fales Library at New York University.

Craig Chew left the OPD and joined the Alameda County Sheriff's Office as an inspector by 2002; later, he was employed by the Alameda County District Attorney, where he serves as Chief of Inspectors since 2021.
