= Constance M. Carroll =

American educator

Chancellor of the San Diego Community College District
- In office 2004 – July 1, 2021

President of San Diego Mesa College
- In office 1993–2004

Personal details
- Born: September 12, 1945 (age 80) Baltimore, Maryland
- Education: Duquesne University (BA); University of Pittsburgh (PhD)
- Profession: Educator

Constance M. Carroll (born September 12, 1945) is an American education leader and advisor. She served as the chancellor of the San Diego Community College District from 2004 to 2021.

== Education ==
Carroll was educated at Duquesne University, where she earned a Bachelor of Arts degree in Humanities in 1966 before spending a year at Knubly University School of Greek Civilization in Athens. In 1969 she earned a Master's degree in Classics at the University of Pittsburgh. She later graduated from Pittsburgh with a PhD in Classics, having written a thesis on ancient Greek tragedy.

== Career ==
Between 1968 and 1972, Carroll held teaching and administrative posts at the University of Pittsburgh, before moving to the University of Maine, where she worked as assistant dean, and later associate dean of the College of Arts and Sciences as well as assistant professor in classics. At the age of 31, she became the youngest Black woman college president in the US when she took up her role as president of Indian Valley Colleges while still studying for her PhD. She also spent time as president of Saddleback College in Orange County and president of Indian Valley Colleges in Marin County, where she also spent one year as interim chancellor of the Marin Community College District. She spent 11 years as president of San Diego Mesa College from 1993 to 2004.

Carroll was appointed by President Obama to the National Council on the Humanities for six years in 2011, and served on numerous local, state, and national boards and committees committed to the San Diego region, educational access, and economic excellence.

Among a whole range of awards, in November 2019, Carroll won the Lifetime Leadership Award from the Central San Diego Black Chamber of Commerce for her dedication to the San Diego community and increasing educational access in the San Diego region.

In May 2020 Carroll was appointed to the National Advisory Board of College Promise, which enables deserving students to attend college without payment of tuition; she had previously led the implementation of the Promise program in San Diego.

She retired as chancellor on July 1, 2021.

After her retirement, she became president and CEO of the California Community College Baccalaureate Association, an organization she helped establish.

In 2023, President Joe Biden appointed Carroll to the President's Committee on the Arts and Humanities.

== Personal life ==
Carroll is Catholic.

== Distinctions and awards ==
- 1996: Harry Buttimer Award, the top honour for a California Community College chief executive officer
- 2004: Visionary Award for Economic Opportunity from LEAD San Diego
- 2007: national Marie Y. Martin CEO Award, Association of Community College Trustees (ACCT)
- 2009: Whitney M. Young Jr., Leadership Award, Urban League of San Diego County
- 2013: Leadership in Action Award, Mental Health America of San Diego County
- 2013: Trailblazer Award, San Diego Women's Hall of Fame
- 2014: Darlene Marcos Shiley Education Leadership Award, San Diego Business Journal's 21st Annual Women Who Mean Business Awards
- 2014: Tireless Advocate for Public Education Award, Interfaith Committee for Worker Justice 'Voices for Justice" Breakfast
- 2015: Dr. Martin Luther King Jr., Human Dignity Award, YMCA of San Diego County
- 2016: Moving San Diego Forward award, San Diego Regional Chamber of Commerce
- 2017: Pioneer Award, national Community College Baccalaureate Association, for her leadership and work in improving access to baccalaureate level education through community colleges
- 2019: Woman of the Year in Senate District 39, awarded by Senate President Toni Atkins
- 2019: Lifetime Leadership Award, Central San Diego Black Chamber of Commerce
- 2019: Lifetime Achievement Award, National Association for Community College Entrepreneurship (NACCE)
- 2022: Clark Kerr Award for distinguished leadership in higher education from the UC Berkeley Academic Senate
