= Rosedith Sitgreaves =

American statistician

Rosedith Sitgreaves Bowker (1915 – February 1, 1992) was an American statistician who taught at Columbia University and Stanford University. Her publications included research on random matrices and Kendall's W.

Rosedith Sitgreaves was born in Easton, Pennsylvania. She did her undergraduate studies at Wilson College, a women's college in Pennsylvania. She earned a master's degree from George Washington University and a doctorate from Columbia University, both in statistical mathematics. Her doctoral dissertation was entitled Contributions to the Problem of Classification. When she completed it, in 1953, she became the first female doctoral graduate of Columbia's statistics program.

Sitgreaves worked at the United States Public Health Service from 1943 to 1953. After completing her doctorate, she worked as a research associate at Stanford University, and then returned to Columbia as a faculty member in education and statistics. In this period, in 1964, she married Albert H. Bowker, a fellow graduate of the Columbia statistics program who at the time was chancellor of the City University of New York and president of the American Statistical Association, as his second wife. Although she used the name "Rosedith Sitgreaves Bowker" in social settings, she continued to use "Rosedith Sitgreaves" as her name for her publications and professional affiliations.

In 1971, the Bowkers moved to California: Al Bowker became chancellor of the University of California, Berkeley, and Sitgreaves taught at California State University, East Bay and then in the school of education at Stanford University. As a woman with her own academic career, she gave UC Berkeley "its first experience of a Chancellor's wife who served successfully as official hostess without sacrificing her professional work" and "opened new possibilities for the spouses of subsequent Chancellors to shape their own roles". After she and her husband retired in 1980, they moved to the Washington, DC area in 1980, where Sitgreaves worked for the National Institute of Education.

In 1960 she was elected as a Fellow of the American Statistical Association.
