= Robert Kibbee =

American university administrator

- Born: August 19, 1921; Staten Island, New York, U.S.
- Died: June 16, 1982 (aged 60)
- Education: Fordham University (BA); University of Chicago (MA, PhD)
- Employer: City University of New York
- Title: Chancellor
- Parents: Guy Kibbee (father); Helen Shay (mother)
- Relatives: Milton Kibbee (uncle), Lois Kibbee (cousin)

Robert Joseph Kibbee (August 19, 1921 – June 16, 1982) was an American university administrator who was Chancellor of the City University of New York.

== Biography ==
Kibbee was born on Staten Island, New York. His father was Hollywood actor Guy Kibbee and his mother was Helen Shay Kibbee; his parents separated when he was a young boy. He attended Xavier High School in Manhattan, New York, and earned a bachelor's degree at Fordham University in 1943.

After serving in World War II in the Philippines from 1940 to 1945, Kibbee earned a master's degree in higher education administration from the University of Chicago in 1947, and a doctorate there in 1957. He was then administrative dean at Southern State College, and in 1955 became dean of students at Drake University. From 1958 to 1961 he worked for the University of Chicago as an educational advisor in Pakistan. Kibbee then served as assistant to President John Warner and as vice president for planning and administration at Carnegie-Mellon University, and as President of the Pittsburgh Board of Education.

Kibbee was Chancellor of the City University of New York, the third-largest university in the United States, from 1971 to 1982. During that time CUNY transitioned to open admissions.

He was married first to Katherine Kirk, and then in 1980 to Margaret Rockwitz.

Kibbee had cranial surgery to remove a tumor, and died on June 16, 1982, two weeks before his scheduled retirement, at 60 years of age. The library at Kingsborough Community College is named after him.
