= Karl S. Pister =

American engineering academic (1925–2022)

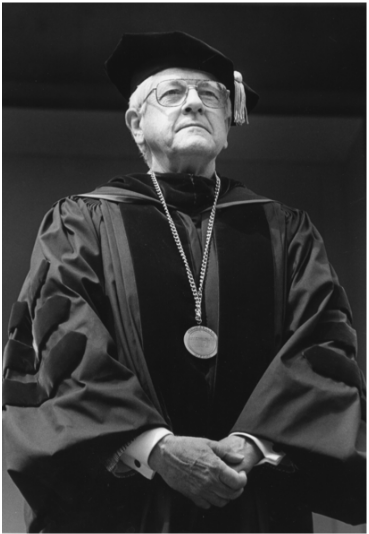
- Receiving the Berkeley Medal, 1996
- Born: June 27, 1925; Stockton, California
- Died: May 14, 2022 (aged 96); Berkeley, California
- Education: University of California, Berkeley (BS, 1945; MS, 1948); University of Illinois, Urbana-Champaign (PhD 1952)
- Occupation: Professor
- Years active: 1952 - 2012
- Known for: Academic leadership
- Title: Professor, Dean, Chancellor

Karl Stark Pister (June 27, 1925 – May 14, 2022) was an American academic in engineering. He held various leadership positions at University of California, Berkeley and University of California, Santa Cruz, including Dean of the College of Engineering and Chancellor.

== Early life, education, and military service ==
Karl Stark Pister was born June 27, 1925, in Stockton, California. He graduated from Stockton High School as class valedictorian in 1942, and from UC Berkeley with a BS in Civil Engineering in 1945. After a short stint in the Naval Reserve and an assignment to Okinawa, Japan, during World War II, he commenced studies at Berkeley during the fall of 1946, and graduated with an MS in Civil Engineering in 1948. This was followed by a PhD in Theoretical and Applied Mechanics from the University of Illinois at Urbana-Champaign in 1952.

== Career ==
=== UC Berkeley ===
When Pister was hired at UC Berkeley in 1952, he initially conducted research on material properties of Portland Cement Concrete and the behavior of torpedo nets. For this early research work, he received the Wason Medal for Research, awarded by the American Concrete Institute. (Note: Pister received the Wason Medal for Materials Research in 1960, but mis-remembered the award year as 1962 in his Oral History book.) During the late 1950s he also began a multi-decade association with Lawrence Livermore National Labs.

Over the next two decades, he served as vice-chair of the Civil Engineering Department (1964–65), Chairman of the Division of Structural Engineering and Structural Mechanics (1970–71), Chairman of Committee on Educational Policy at Berkeley (1972–73), Senate Policy chair and Academic Senate, Berkeley Division, vice chair (1976–78), and Vice chairman and chairman of the nine-campus Academic Council and Assembly of the Academic Senate (1978–1980).

Pister returned to UC Berkeley as vice president for Educational Outreach in the UC Office of the President (1999–2000) and to chair the task force on upgrading California Memorial Stadium (2004–2012). Pister was committed to promote social justice.

=== University of Illinois ===
A distinguished alumnus of the University of Illinois at Urbana-Champaign, Pister was appointed Dean of the College of Engineering in 1980, a position he held for ten years. From 1985 to 1990, he was the first holder of the Roy W. Carlson Chair in Engineering.

=== UC Santa Cruz ===
From 1991 to 1996, Pister served as Chancellor at the University of California, Santa Cruz. During his tenure, the university experiences various challenges, including budget cuts due to the recession, the UC Regents' divisive stance on affirmative action, tense university-community relationships, and conflicts over campus development projects. He introduced a collaborative budgeting approach while maintaining morale among faculty, staff, and students. Moreover, Pister actively supported university engagement in strengthening regional K-12 education.

== Awards and recognition ==
The American Society for Engineering Education presented him with the Vincent Bendix Award for Minorities in Engineering and the Benjamin Garver Lamme Medal. He is also a Fellow of the American Academy of Mechanics, the American Society of Mechanical Engineers, and the American Association for the Advancement of Science, as well as an Honorary Fellow of the California Academy of Sciences.

Pister was elected to the National Academy of Engineering in 1980 for his "contributions in the use of advanced principles of mechanics in understanding the behavior of engineering materials." In 1994, he was elected as a fellow of the American Academy of Arts and Sciences, in the area of "Mathematical and Physical Sciences" with specialty "Engineering and Technology".

Pister received the Berkeley Medal (1996) and the Presidential Medal of the University of California (2000). In 2006, The California Alumni Association named him Cal Alumnus of the Year.

To celebrate Pister's 95th birthday, the academic journal Computer Modeling in Engineering & Sciences (CMES) published a special issue in Pister's honor.

== Personal life ==
Karl Pister married Rita Olsen in 1950. They have four daughters and two sons.
