= John R. Everett =

American academic and university administrator

- Born: December 27, 1918; Portland, Oregon, U.S.
- Died: January 21, 1992 (aged 73); New York City, New York, U.S.
- Education: AB in 1942 from Park College; MA in 1943 from Columbia University; BD in 1944 from Union Theological Seminary; PhD in 1945 from Columbia University.
- Known for: President of Hollins College; first Chancellor of the Municipal College System of the City of New York; President of the New School for Social Research

John Rutherford Everett (December 27, 1918 – January 21, 1992) was a college administrator. He was President of Hollins College, the first Chancellor of the Municipal College System of the City of New York, and the President of the New School for Social Research.

== Biography ==
Everett was born in Portland, Oregon. He earned an AB in 1942 from Park College, an MA in 1943 in economics from Columbia University, a BD in 1944 from Union Theological Seminary, and a PhD in 1945 in philosophy from Columbia University.

In 1950 when he was 31 years of age Everett was elected President of Hollins College, a position he held until he resigned in 1960. In 1960 he became the first Chancellor of the Municipal College System of the City of New York, for a salary of $25,000 ($272,000 in current dollar terms). In 1964 he became the President of the New School for Social Research. He retired in 1982. He died of pancreatic cancer in 1992 at 73 years of age.
