= Rich Lyons =

University leader and economist (born 1961)

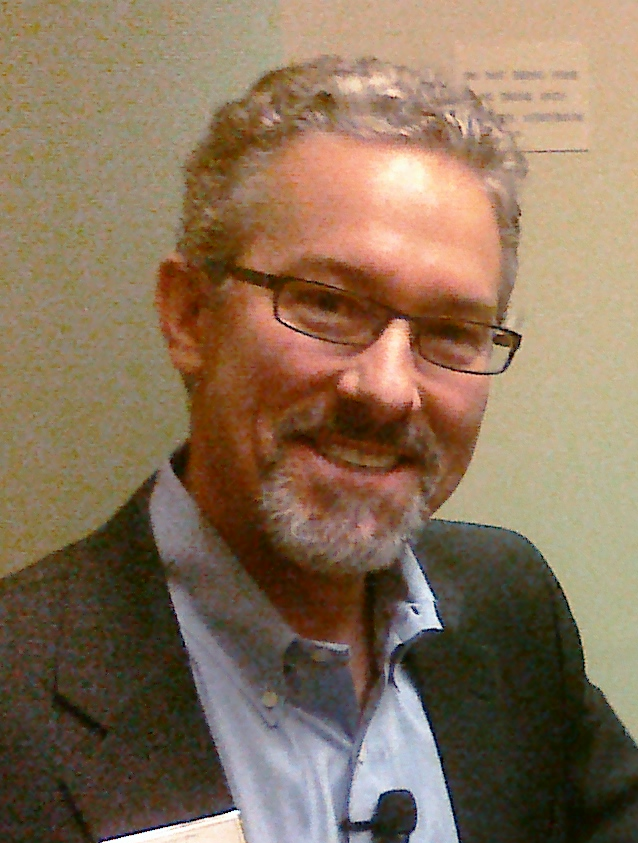
- Lyons in 2010

12th Chancellor of the University of California, Berkeley
- Incumbent
- Assumed office July 1, 2024
- Preceded by: Carol T. Christ

Personal details
- Born: Richard Kent Lyons; February 10, 1961 (age 65) Palo Alto, California, U.S.
- Education: University of California, Berkeley (BS); Massachusetts Institute of Technology (PhD)
- Scientific career
- Fields: Economics
- Thesis: Three essays on exchange rate determination (1988)
- Doctoral advisor: Rudiger Dornbusch

Richard Kent Lyons (born February 10, 1961) is an American economist who has been the 12th chancellor of the University of California, Berkeley, since July 2024.

At UC Berkeley, he served as chief innovation and entrepreneurship officer from 2020 to 2024 and as dean of its Haas School of Business from 2008 to 2018. He joined the UC Berkeley business faculty in 1993 after earning a Ph.D. in economics from the Massachusetts Institute of Technology and teaching at Columbia University for six years.

== Early life and education ==
Lyons was born on February 10, 1961, in Palo Alto, California. He received a Bachelor of Science in business from the University of California, Berkeley, and was a member of the Sigma Alpha Epsilon fraternity there. He then received a Ph.D. in economics from the Massachusetts Institute of Technology in 1988 under the supervision of Rudiger Dornbusch. He is married and has two children.

== Career ==
Before joining Haas in 1993, Lyons spent six years on the faculty at Columbia Business School. In addition to teaching, he has been acting dean (2004–05), executive associate dean (2005–08), and dean (2008–18) at Haas School of Business. Lyons also served as the chief learning officer at Goldman Sachs in New York City from 2006 to 2008.

== Personal life ==
Lyons' son, Jake, is a professional GeoGuessr player and broadcaster.

Academic offices
Preceded by Tom Campbell	Bank of America Dean of the Haas School of Business; 2008 – 2018	Succeeded by Ann Harrison
Preceded by Carol T. Christ	12th Chancellor of the University of California, Berkeley; 2024–present	Incumbent
