= Carol T. Christ =

American academic (born 1944)

Carol Christ
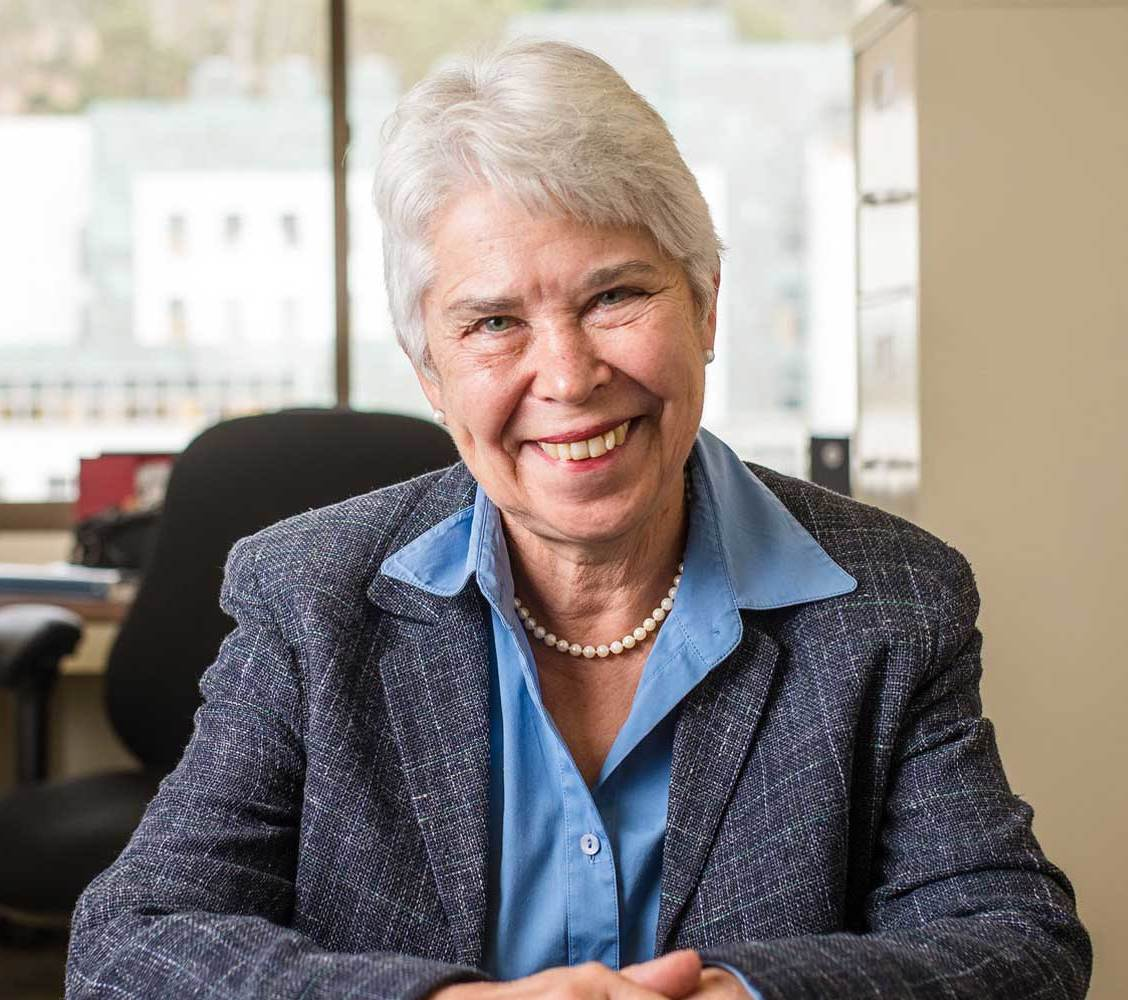
- Christ in 2015

11th Chancellor of the University of California, Berkeley
- In office July 1, 2017 – June 30, 2024
- Preceded by: Nicholas Dirks
- Succeeded by: Rich Lyons

10th President of Smith College
- In office 2002–2013
- Preceded by: Ruth Simmons
- Succeeded by: Kathleen McCartney

Personal details
- Born: Carol Tecla Christ; 1944 (age 81–82) New York City, New York, U.S.
- Spouse: Paul Alpers (married 1992, died 2013)
- Children: 2 (from previous marriage)
- Education: Rutgers University, New Brunswick (BA); Yale University (MPhil, PhD)
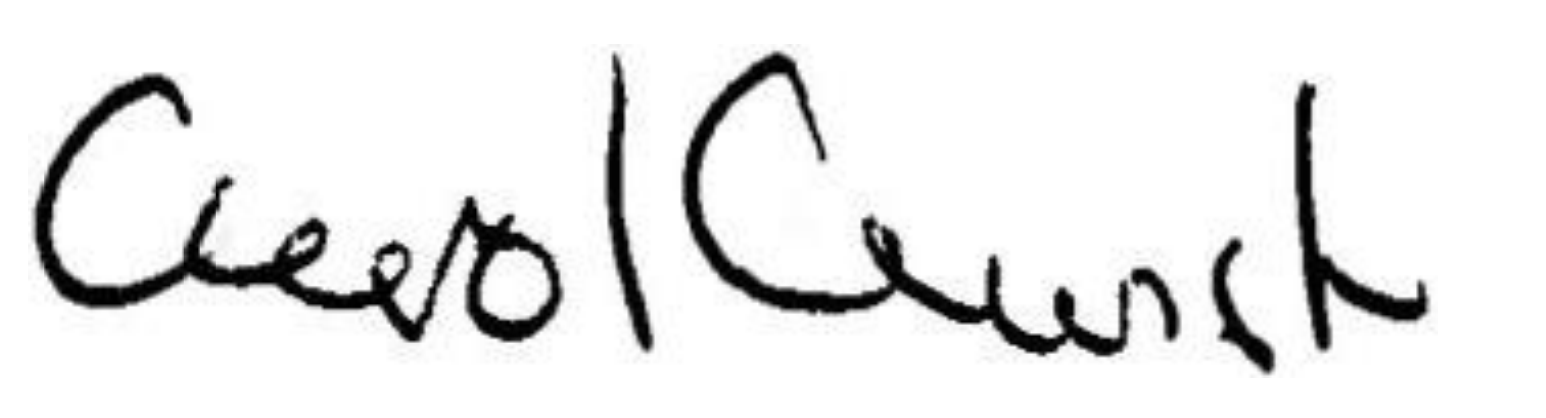
- Signature

Academic background
- Thesis: The aesthetic of particularity in the poetry of Rossetti, Browning, and Hopkins (1970)

Academic work
- Discipline: English literature
- Institutions: University of California, Berkeley; Smith College

Carol Tecla Christ (born 1944) is an American former academic administrator. She served as the 11th Chancellor of the University of California, Berkeley, from 2017 to 2024.

== Early life and education ==
Christ was born in New York City. In 1966, she graduated with high honors in English from Douglass College, the women's college at Rutgers University. She received an M.Phil. in 1969 and a Ph.D. in 1970 in English from Yale University.

== Career ==
In 1970, Christ joined the faculty at the University of California, Berkeley, and was chair of the English department from 1985 to 1988. In 1988, she was appointed dean of humanities, mathematics, and natural sciences. She also served as provost and dean of the College of Letters and Sciences. In 1994, Christ was appointed vice chancellor, assistant manager, and provost (and later became executive vice chancellor) at Berkeley. Christ was the highest-ranking female administrator at Berkeley until she returned to full-time teaching in 2000.

Christ became the 10th president of Smith College in 2002. At Smith, Christ led a strategic planning process to identify the distinctive intellectual traditions of the Smith curriculum and foster initiatives to further develop students' essential capacities. Throughout her administrative career, Christ has maintained an active program of teaching and research. She has published two books: The Finer Optic: The Aesthetic of Particularity in Victorian Poetry and Victorian and Modern Poetics. She also edited a Norton Critical Edition of George Eliot's The Mill on the Floss and co-edited the Norton Anthology of English Literature and Victorian Literature and The Victorian Visual Imagination. Until recently, she was professor of English at Smith, offering seminars on science and literature and on the arts.

Christ was President of Smith College from 2002 to 2013. She announced in May 2012 that she, along with the Board of Trustees, had begun the search for her successor. She retired in June 2013.

In May 2016, Christ returned to her role as Berkeley's Executive Vice Chancellor and Provost (interim), replacing Claude Steele, who stepped down. On March 13, 2017, University of California President Janet Napolitano named Christ as Berkeley's new Chancellor-elect, and three days later, the Regents of the University of California confirmed her appointment. On July 1, 2017, Christ became the 11th Berkeley Chancellor and the first woman to serve in this role, succeeding Chancellor Nicholas B. Dirks.

At the start of her first academic year as chancellor, Christ responded to the 2017 Berkeley protests in which protests against conservative speakers led to violent outbreaks. In a letter to the campus which quoted John Stuart Mill, she affirmed the administration's commitment to free speech and urged the community to remember its roots as part of the Free Speech Movement. She later took other steps in this direction which included moderating a panel on free expression and committing $800,000 to providing security for controversial speakers. In a September 2017 interview, she stated that some students find the concept of free speech objectionable.

Christ led the biggest fundraising drive in the history of the university. The Light the Way campaign raised over $7 billion in three years, the largest amount ever for a public university.

Upon taking office Chancellor Christ set ambitious goals to increase the amount of campus housing for students. Under her leadership numerous projects were built or begun, including: the Helen Diller Anchor House, a $300 million, donor-funded, 772-bed facility for undergraduate transfer students; xucyun ruwway in Albany, with 761 beds for graduate students; the Judith E. Heumann House on the former People's Park site, with 1,100 beds for students alongside supportive living units for the unhoused; and a 23 story, 1600-bed dorm at Bancroft Way and Fulton for first and second year students.

Under Chancellor Christ's leadership UC Berkeley opened its first new college in over 50 years, The College of Computing, Data Science, and Society, housed in the newly constructed $560 million Barbara and Gerson Bakar Gateway. Chancellor Christ's tenure has been described as a "golden age" for UC Berkeley infrastructure.

Christ is Chair of the Board of Trustees for the Central European University, Chair of the Board of the prestigious think tank SLMath (Simons Laufer Mathematical Sciences Institute), Co-Chair of Cal Performances, a board member of the Marlboro Music Festival, served on the board of the Consortium on Financing Higher Education (COFHE) and was a trustee of Sarah Lawrence College and Dominican University of California.

Christ retired as chancellor in June 2024. She was succeeded by former Haas School of Business dean Richard K. Lyons.

Christ also served on the Board of Trustees of Rutgers University, her alma mater.

== Honors ==
Christ was elected a Fellow of the American Academy of Arts and Sciences in 2004 and a Member of the American Philosophical Society in 2013. Additionally, she was awarded Yale University's Wilbur Cross Medal in 2007, and in 2011, the American College of Greece awarded her an honorary doctorate.

In 2024 Christ received the Clark Kerr Award for distinguished leadership in higher education from the UC Berkeley Academic Senate.

In August 2026 The Carol T. Christ Center for Connected Learning was dedicated in her honor at the reimagined undergraduate Moffitt Library on the UC Berkeley campus. Christ had long lobbied and worked for a “third space” apart from classrooms and residences where students could gather to study, create, and socialize.

== Personal life ==
Christ's late husband, Paul Alpers, was a scholar of Renaissance English literature and the founding director of Berkeley's Townsend Center for the Humanities until his death in 2013. She has two grown children, Jonathan and Elizabeth Sklute, from a previous marriage, as well as two grandchildren. She currently lives in Berkeley, California.

== Selected publications ==
- Carol T. Christ (October 15, 1968). Victorian and Modern Poetics. University of Chicago Press. ISBN 9780226104591.
- Carol T. Christ (March 1975). Finer Optic: The Aesthetic of Particularity in Victorian Poetry. Yale University Press. ISBN 9780300017755.
- Carol T. Christ; John O. Jordan (1995). Victorian Literature and the Victorian Visual Imagination. University of California Press. ISBN 9780520200227.
- Stephen Greenblatt; Carol T. Christ; M. H. Abrams; Catherine Robson (February 10, 2012). The Norton Anthology of English Literature: Ninth Edition. W. W. Norton & Company. ISBN 9780393913002.

Academic offices
Preceded by Ruth Simmons	10th President of Smith College; 2002–2013	Succeeded by Kathleen McCartney
Preceded by Nicholas Dirks	11th Chancellor of the University of California, Berkeley; 2017–2024	Succeeded by Richard Lyons designate
