= Chang-Lin Tien =

Taiwanese-American academic (1935–2002)

Chang-Lin Tien GBM
- 田長霖

7th Chancellor of the University of California, Berkeley
- In office 1990–1997
- Preceded by: Ira Michael Heyman
- Succeeded by: Robert M. Berdahl

Personal details
- Born: July 24, 1935 Wuhan, Hubei, Republic of China
- Died: October 29, 2002 (aged 67) Redwood City, California, U.S.
- Spouse: Di-Hwa Liu (劉棣華)
- Children: 3
- Education: National Taiwan University (BS); University of Louisville (MS); Princeton University (MA, PhD)
- Awards: Max Jakob Memorial Award (1981); ASME Thurston Lecture Award (1993)
- Scientific career
- Fields: Mechanical engineering
- Workplaces: University of California, Berkeley; University of California, Irvine
- Thesis: Transport processes in two-phase turbulent flow (1959)
- Doctoral advisor: Shao-lee Soo
- Doctoral students: Gang Chen

Chang-Lin Tien (Chinese: 田長霖; pinyin: Tián Chánglín; July 24, 1935 – October 29, 2002) was a Taiwanese engineering professor who was the chancellor of the University of California, Berkeley, from 1990 to 1997. He was the first person of Asian descent to head a major research university in the United States.

== Early life and education ==
Chang-Lin Tien was born in Huangpi, Hubei, China, on July 24, 1935. His father, Tian Yong-chien, was a wealthy banker who graduated from Peking University with a degree in physics and became a financial commissioner in the Kuomintang government. His mother, Lee Yun-Di, was a member of a family of intellectuals. During the Second Sino-Japanese War, the family lost their possessions and fled to the Shanghai French Concession, where Yong-chien became the head of a major bank and Shanghai's commissioner of commerce.

Due to the Chinese Civil War, the family became impoverished again. When Tien was fourteen years old, they fled Shanghai for Taiwan in 1949 during the Great Retreat; his father died of depression and a heart attack at age 54. In high school, he worked odd jobs to support the family. After graduating from Taipei Municipal Chien Kuo High School, Tien studied mechanical engineering at National Taiwan University and received a Bachelor of Science (B.S.) in 1955 at age 19.

Upon completing his undergraduate degree, Tien served one year in the Republic of China Armed Forces and won a full scholarship to attend the University of Louisville for graduate studies in the United States. After obtaining a Master of Science (M.S.) in thermodynamics from Louisville in 1956, he completed doctoral studies at Princeton University, where he earned a Master of Arts (M.A.) and his Ph.D. in mechanical engineering in 1959 after only two years of study. His doctoral dissertation was titled, "Transport processes in two-phase turbulent flow".

== Academic career ==
Tien joined UC Berkeley faculty as an assistant professor of mechanical engineering in 1959, and three years later, at the age of 26, became the youngest professor ever to be honored with UC Berkeley's Distinguished Teaching Award. He was promoted to full professor in 1968 and served as the chair of the Department of Mechanical Engineering from 1974 to 1981. From 1983 to 1985, he served as vice chancellor of research. Tien spent his entire career at Berkeley, except for 1988–90 when he was executive vice-chancellor of UC Irvine. In 1999, Tien received the prestigious title of "University Professor".

Tien was an expert in thermal science and researched on thermal radiation, thermal insulation, microscale thermal phenomena, fluid flow, phase-change energy transfer, heat pipes, reactor safety, cryogenics, and fire phenomena, authoring more than 300 research journal and monograph articles, 16 edited volumes, and one book. Up until 2005, his work was posthumously published in the Annual Review of Heat Transfer.

As chancellor, Tien was a leading supporter of affirmative action. After the Regents banned the use of racial preferences in 1995 for university admissions, Tien launched the "Berkeley Pledge," an outreach program designed to recruit disadvantaged students from the state's public schools. Amid an 18% budget cut, Tien launched "The Promise of Berkeley – Campaign for the New Century", a fundraising drive that raised $1.44 billion. In December 1996, President Bill Clinton put him on the shortlist of candidates for United States Secretary of Energy, but Tien was removed after the Chinese campaign finance scandal made headlines; the unsealed Federal Bureau of Investigation file for Tien showed he had been investigated as a potential foreign agent as early as 1973, but no evidence ever was found to support this assumption.

Known for his "Go Bears!" spirit, Tien was very popular with students, often showing up at student rallies and sporting events wearing his "Cal" baseball cap. He was commonly seen picking up trash in Sproul Plaza, appearing in the library in the middle of the night during finals week, or checking up on students in the residence halls and classrooms.

After stepping down from the chancellorship in 1997, Tien was appointed to the National Science Board and the National Commission on Mathematics and Science Teaching for the 21st Century in 1999. He was diagnosed with brain cancer in 2000 and suffered a stroke during surgery to treat it, prompting his resignation in 2001.

Tien was a member of the National Academy of Engineering, the Academia Sinica (in Taiwan), the American Academy of Arts and Sciences, the American Association for the Advancement of Science, the American Institute of Aeronautics and Astronautics, the American Society of Mechanical Engineers, and the Chinese Academy of Sciences (in mainland China).

=== Personal life ===
During his residency in the United States, Tien became an American citizen.

Shortly before instruction for the 1992–93 academic year started, a young woman named Rosebud Denovo was killed by police after she broke into University House, the chancellor's residence, during an apparent assassination attempt. Tien and his family were unharmed.

Tien died in Redwood City, California at the age of 67. A brain tumor had forced him into hospitalization two years earlier; while hospitalized, he suffered a stroke from which he never fully recovered. He was survived by his wife Di-Hwa; his son Norman Tien, currently Taikoo Professor of Engineering and Chair Professor of Microsystems Technology at the University of Hong Kong (HKU), and Dean of Faculty of Engineering at HKU from June 2012 to May 2018; and daughters Christine Tien, Stockton's former deputy city manager; and Dr. Phyllis Tien, a UC San Francisco physician.

== Legacy ==
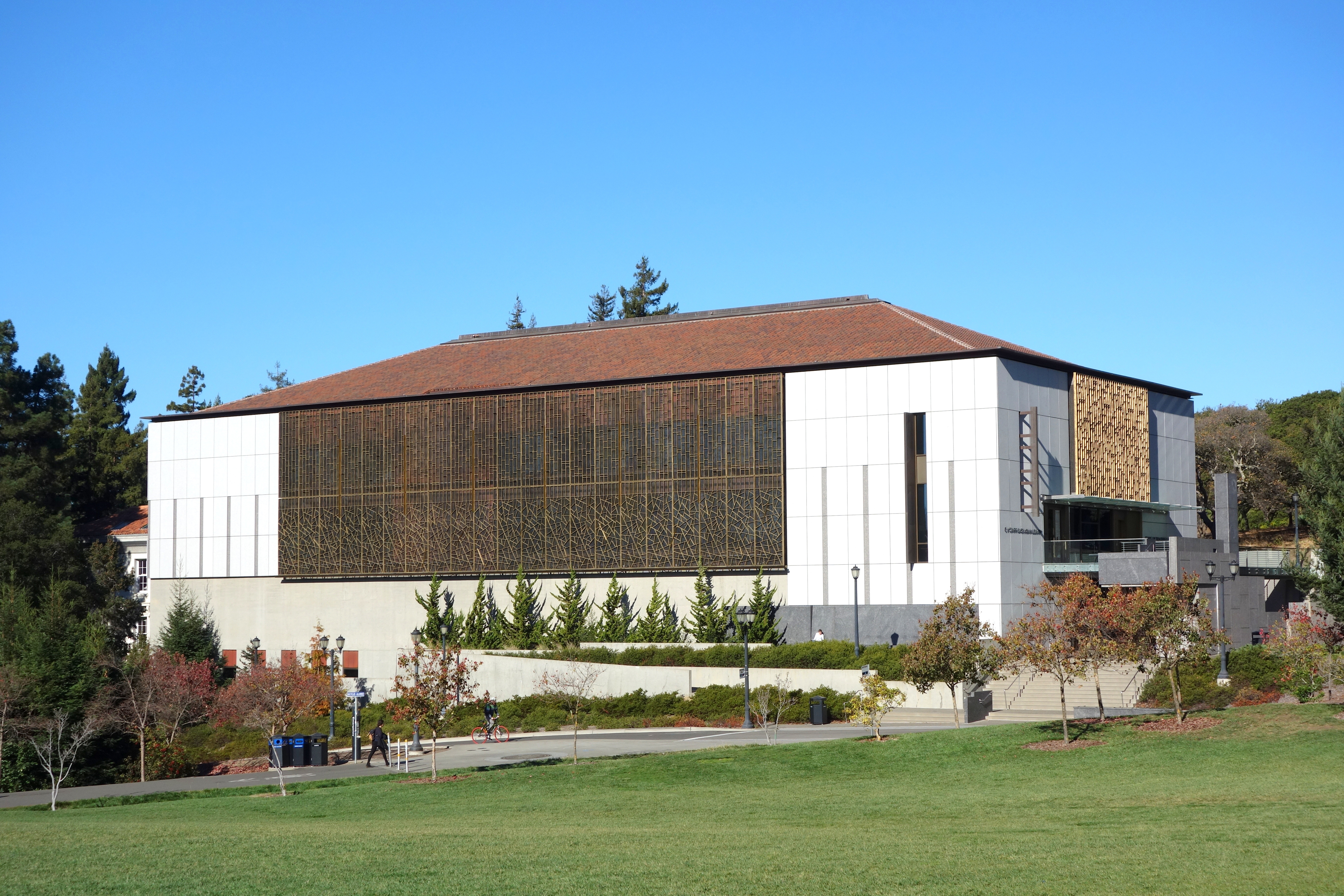
The Tien Center for East Asian Studies is housed in the C.V. Starr East Asian Library at UC Berkeley (2013)

- Asteroid "Tienchanglin" (formerly #3643), discovered by the Zi Jin Mountain Observatory in China in 1978, was formally named for the former chancellor in 1999.
- Oil tanker M/T Chang-Lin Tien was christened in 2000 for the Chevron Corporation. It was subsequently renamed to M/T Regulus Voyager after being sold to Space Shipping in 2003, then M/T Maran Regulus after being sold to Maran Tankers in 2014.
- The Tien Center for East Asian Studies at UC Berkeley opened in 2008.
- Asian Pacific Fund's Chang-Lin Tien Award.

Academic offices
Preceded by Ira Michael Heyman	Chancellor of the University of California, Berkeley; 1990–1997	Succeeded by Robert M. Berdahl
