= Ira Michael Heyman =

American lawyer and academic administrator

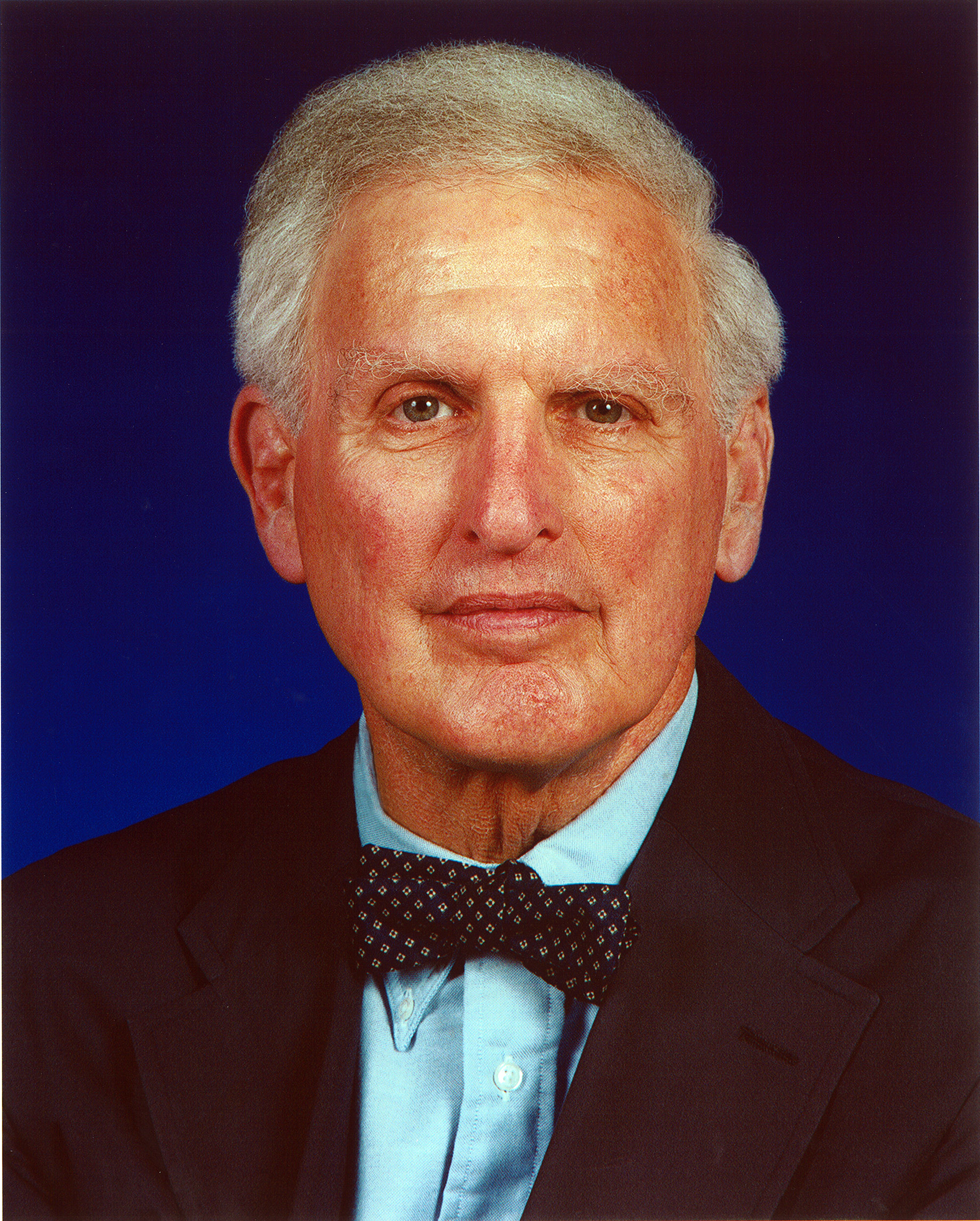
- Heyman in 1994

10th Secretary of the Smithsonian Institution
- In office 1994–1999
- Preceded by: Robert McCormick Adams
- Succeeded by: Lawrence M. Small

6th Chancellor of the University of California, Berkeley
- In office 1980–1990
- Preceded by: Albert H. Bowker
- Succeeded by: Chang-Lin Tien

Personal details
- Born: May 30, 1930 New York City, New York
- Died: November 19, 2011 (aged 81) Berkeley, California
- Spouse: Therese Thau
- Education: Dartmouth College (BA); Yale Law School (JD)

Ira Michael Heyman (May 30, 1930 – November 19, 2011) was an American lawyer. He was a professor of law and of city and regional planning, and was Chancellor of University of California, Berkeley, and Secretary of the Smithsonian Institution.

== Life ==
Heyman was born in 1930 in New York City. He graduated from the Bronx High School of Science, and in 1951 from Dartmouth College. At Dartmouth he joined the Theta Chi men's fraternity. After serving as a U.S. Marine Corps officer during the Korean War, he entered Yale Law School, where he became editor of the Yale Law Journal. Following his graduation in 1956, he served as a law clerk for Judge Charles Edward Clark of the U.S. Court of Appeals for the Second Circuit, and then from 1958 to 1959 he was a clerk for Chief Justice Earl Warren.

He joined the law faculty at Berkeley in 1959, and he became Vice Chancellor in 1974. He was named Berkeley's sixth Chancellor and served in that capacity from 1980 to 1990.

He returned to teaching law after leaving the Chancellorship. He was Counselor to the Secretary and Deputy Assistant Secretary for Policy at the U.S. Department of Interior, from 1993 to 1994; and Secretary of the Smithsonian Institution from 1994 to 2000. He served as a trustee of Dartmouth College from 1982 until 1992 and as the chair of the Board of Trustees for the last two years of his tenure. During his Berkeley years he became a member of the Bohemian Club, at which his closest associates included Caspar Weinberger, who was Ronald Reagan's Secretary of Defense.

After having smoked a few packages of cigarettes a day for many years, he died of emphysema in 2011.

== Works ==
- Report of the Ad Hoc Committee on Student Conduct (1964)
- Women Students at Berkeley, views and data on possible sex discrimination in academic programs (1977)
- Concern for the individual; the community YWCA and other Berkeley organizations (1978)
- The Nobel Tradition at Berkeley, University of California, Berkeley (1984)
- The Smithsonian Institution, 1994-1999:oral history transcript (2012)

== See also ==
- List of law clerks for the chief justice of the United States

Academic offices
Preceded by Albert H. Bowker	6th Chancellor of the University of California, Berkeley; 1980 – 1990	Succeeded by Chang-Lin Tien
Government offices
Preceded by Robert McCormick Adams	10th Secretary of the Smithsonian Institution; 1994 – 1999	Succeeded by Lawrence M. Small
