= Roger W. Heyns =

American professor and academic

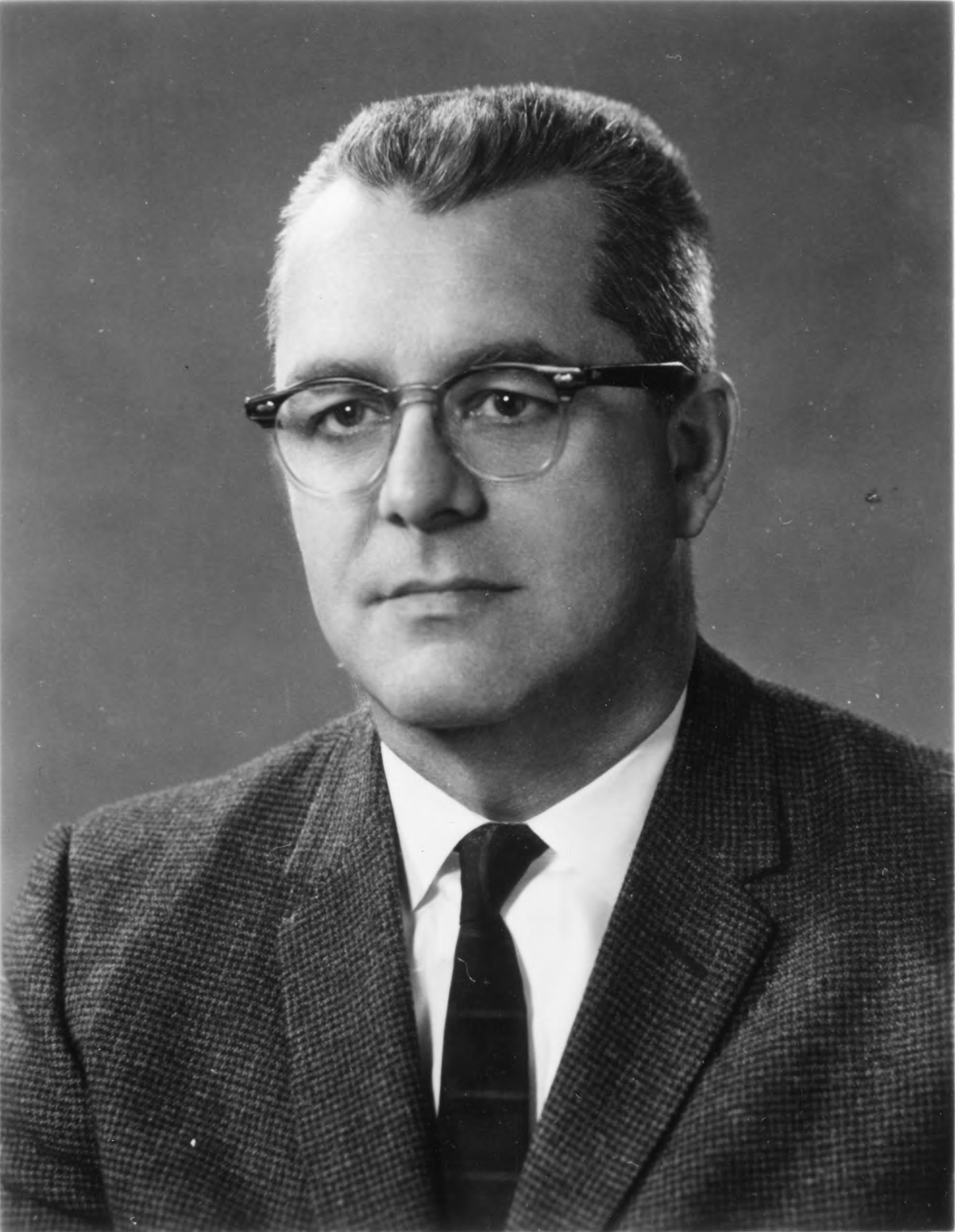
Heyns before 1965

Roger William Heyns (January 27, 1918, Grand Rapids, Michigan – September 11, 1995, Volos, Greece) was an American professor and academic administrator who served as the fourth chancellor of the University of California, Berkeley from 1965 to 1971 and as the vice president for academic affairs of the University of Michigan from 1962-1965.

== Education ==
He received his A.B. degree from Calvin College in 1940 and his M.A. and Ph.D. in psychology from the University of Michigan.

== Personal life ==
Heyns was born to parents Dr. Garrett Heyns and Rose Heyns. His father was a well-known penologist. He grew up in Holland, Michigan, and graduated from Holland Christian High School in 1935, following which he had a severe case of polio which delayed his entrance to college. A year later, he enrolled in Calvin College where he served as the student body president. Heyns graduated in 1940 and went on to get his Master's Degree at the University of Michigan, and then a PhD in psychology. He also served in the Armed Forces Psychological Services. Calvin University still offers a scholarship for students in honor of Heyns and his wife, the funds for which are provided by the William and Flora Hewlett Foundation, located in Palo Alto, where Heyns served as president from the years 1977 to 1992.

Heyns died at the age of 77, while on vacation in the Mediterranean. His cause of death was heart failure. At the time of his death, his obituary noted that he was survived by his wife Esther (née Gezon), and three sons; Michael, John, and Daniel. A large reading room located inside of Doe Library on the UC Berkeley campus is named after him.

== Career ==
Heyns spent the first part of his career as a professor of psychology at the University of Michigan, where he had obtained his graduate degrees. He started teaching there in 1947, two years before receiving his doctorate, and in 1957 was promoted to dean of UMich's College of Literature, Science, and the Arts. In 1961, he was again promoted to vice president of academic affairs.

Heyns served as UC Berkeley's chancellor from 1965 to 1971. UC President Clark Kerr later wrote that of all the chancellors he personally worked with, Heyns had the most tormenting assignment of all. Heyns suffered a heart attack during his tenure as Chancellor, which may have been a factor in his choosing to return in 1971 to a teaching position at the University of Michigan.

In 1968, Heyns became involved in the turmoil of Berkeley's Free Speech Movement. After retiring from the chancellorship, Heyns went on to serve as president of the William and Flora Hewlett Foundation and also co-founded the Public Policy Institute of California.
