= List of chancellors of the University of California, Merced =

The following persons have served as chancellor of University of California, Merced

== List ==
No.	Portrait	Name	Term start	Term end	Length	Refs.
1		Carol Tomlinson-Keasey	August 1, 1999	August 31, 2006	7 years, 30 days	
Acting		Roderic B. Park	September 1, 2006	February 28, 2007	180 days	
2		Sung Mo Kang	March 1, 2007	June 30, 2011	4 years, 121 days	
3		Dorothy Leland	July 1, 2011	August 14, 2019	8 years, 44 days	
Acting		Nathan Brostrom	August 15, 2019	July 31, 2020	351 days	
4		Juan Sánchez Muñoz	August 1, 2020	Present	5 years, 357 days	

== See also ==
- List of presidents of the University of California
- List of chancellors of the University of California, Berkeley
- List of chancellors of the University of California, Davis
- List of chancellors of the University of California, Irvine
- List of chancellors of the University of California, Los Angeles
- List of chancellors of the University of California, Riverside
- List of chancellors of the University of California, San Diego
- List of chancellors of the University of California, San Francisco
- List of chancellors of the University of California, Santa Barbara
- List of chancellors of the University of California, Santa Cruz
