= Baskin School of Engineering =

Engineering school at the University of California, Santa Cruz

Coordinates: 37.001°N 122.063°W

- Type: Public
- Established: 1997
- Parent institution: University of California, Santa Cruz
- Dean: Alexander L. Wolf
- Students: 4,727 (2018-19)
- Undergraduates: 4,165 (2018-19)
- Postgraduates: 562 (2018-19)
- Location: Santa Cruz, California, United States
- Website: https://engineering.ucsc.edu/

The Baskin School of Engineering, known simply as Baskin Engineering, is the school of engineering at the University of California, Santa Cruz. It consists of six departments: Applied Mathematics, Biomolecular Engineering, Computational Media, Computer Science and Engineering, Electrical and Computer Engineering, and Statistics.

Baskin Engineering is a leader in the field of games and playable media, and was the first school in the country to offer a graduate degree in Serious Games. The school is also renowned for its research in genomics and bioinformatics, having played a critical role in the Human Genome Project. Researchers at UC Santa Cruz were responsible for creating the UCSC Genome Browser, which continues to be an important open-source tool for researchers in genomics. In 2022, the Baskin School continued this work finishing first truly complete sequence of the human genome, covering each chromosome from end to end with no gaps and unprecedented accuracy, is now accessible through the UCSC Genome Browser.

== Degrees offered ==
The Baskin School of Engineering offers degrees in the following areas:

Majors & Degrees Offered	B.A.	B.S.	M.S.	Ph.D.	Other
Applied Mathematics		*	*	*	
Bioengineering		*			
Bioinformatics		*			
Bioinformatics & Biomolecular Engineering		*	*	*	B.S./M.S, B.S./Ph.D
Computer Engineering		*	*	*	B.S./M.S.
Computer Science	*	*	*	*	B.S./M.S.
Computational Media: Computer Game Design		*			
Computational Media			*	*	
Electrical Engineering		*	*	*	
Games & Playable Media			*		
Natural Language Processing			*		
Network and Digital Technology	*				
Robotics Engineering		*			
Scientific Computing & Applied Mathematics			*		
Serious Games			*		
Statistical Science			*	*	
Technology and Information Management		*			

In addition to these degree programs, the Baskin School also offers emphases in Computational Media, Human Language Media and Modeling, Robotics and Control (graduate minor), Scientific Computing, and Statistics

== Research ==
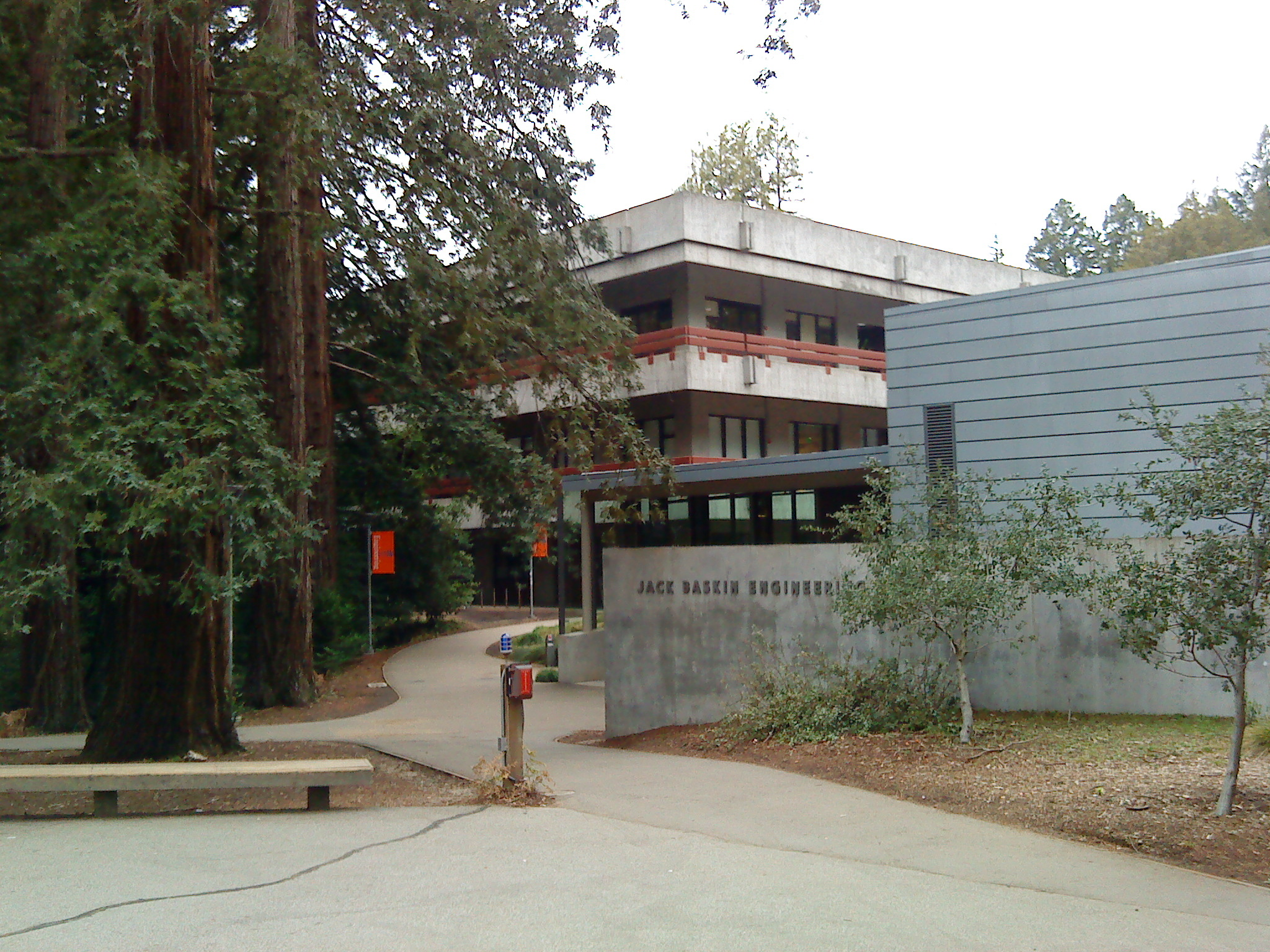
Approaching Baskin from McLaughlin Drive

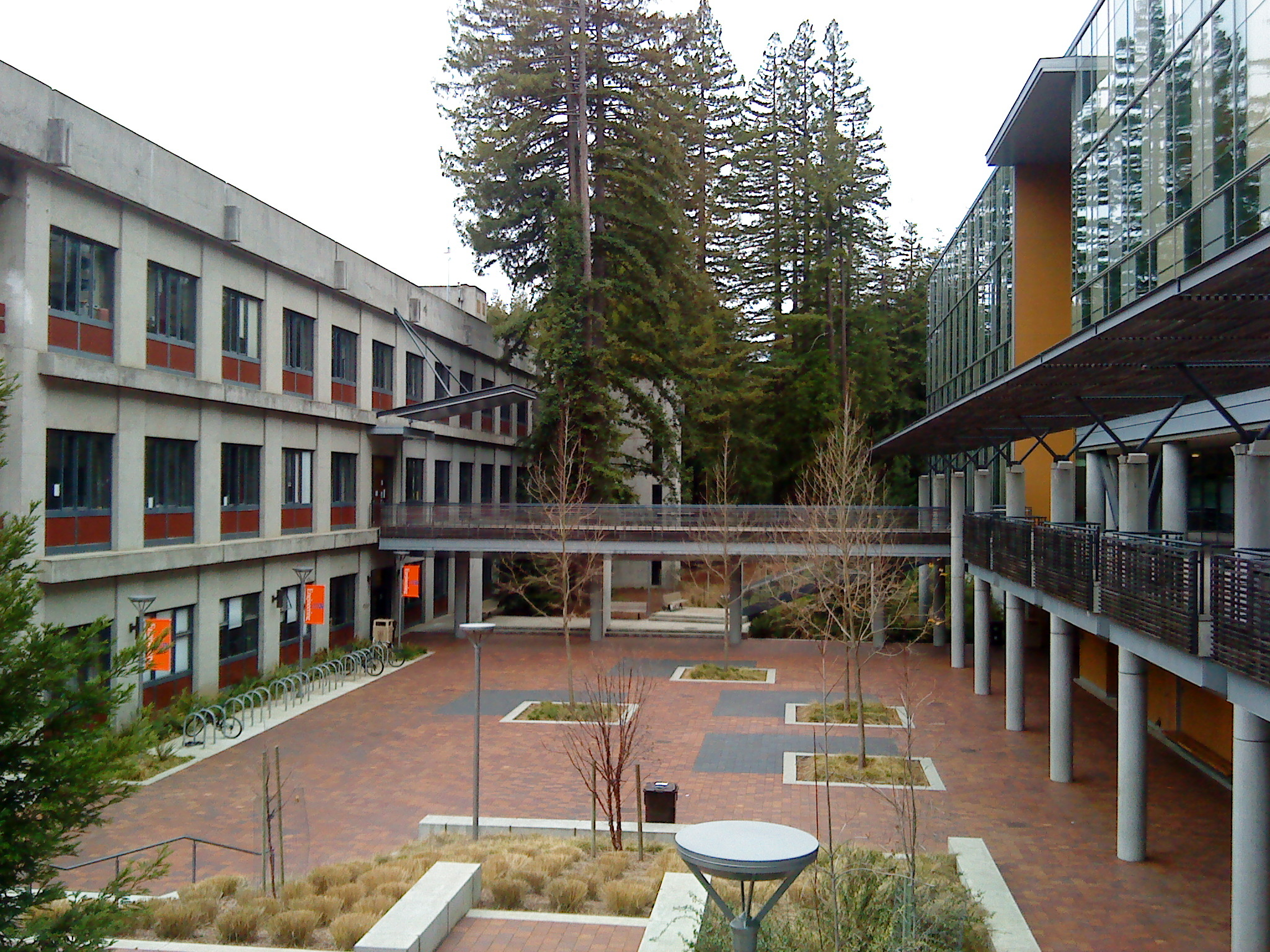
Jack Baskin Plaza is located between Engineering 1 (left) and Engineering 2 (right).

=== Research areas ===
Because of its proximity to Silicon Valley, the Baskin School of Engineering has strong ties to technology corporations and start-ups, and tends to focus its research on innovations in big data, cyber-physical systems, genomics, and computational media. Its current research areas include:

- Algorithms, logic and complexity
- Artificial intelligence and machine learning
- Bayesian statistics
- Bioinformatics and genomics
- Communications, signals, and digital image processing
- Computational biology
- Computer hardware: architecture, chip design, FPGAs, and electronic design automation
- Computer games
- Computer security and privacy
- Computer vision, visualization, and graphics
- Cyber-physical systems
- Database systems
- Data science
- Distributed systems
- Electronic circuit
- Human–computer interaction
- Mathematical modeling and numerical analysis
- Nanoscience and nanotechnology
- Natural language processing
- Networks
- Photonics and electronic devices
- Power systems and energy engineering
- Programming languages
- Real-time systems
- Remote sensing and environmental technology
- Robotics and control
- Systems biology
- Software engineering
- Storage systems
- Vaccines and antiviral therapeutics

=== Role in sequencing the human genome ===
In May 1985, Robert L. Sinsheimer, then Chancellor of the University of California, Santa Cruz, conducted a workshop on the feasibility of sequencing the human genome. Sinsheimer and his colleagues in the Biology Department had determined that the project would require developing more powerful methods for genetic mapping and cloning, an automated means of sequencing, and improved means of data storage, and invited leading scientists in all these areas to the workshop. The group determined that the task was feasible, but was split on whether it would be worth the time and funding. It would take another several years before an academic consortium could obtain the funding needed for the task. The publicly-funded Human Genome Project was officially launched in 1990, with the backing of the NIH and other organizations throughout the world.

In 1998, the private Celera Corporation started a parallel sequencing project that was able to proceed more quickly and at a lower cost than the public project because it made use of the data that the academic consortium had made openly available. Researchers in the consortium became nervous that if Celera was able to complete the sequencing project first, it would patent the results and restrict the redistribution and scientific use of the data. In May of 2000, Jim Kent, a biology graduate student at UC Santa Cruz who had a background as a computer programmer, approached Computer Science Professor David Haussler and offered to write an assembly program using a sampler strategy. Haussler had rigged together a makeshift supercomputer out of 100 Dell Pentium III processor workstations for the genome project, but Celera was working with one of the most powerful computer systems available at the time, and their chances looked grim. Desperate to try anything that might allow academics to keep the genomic data open-source, Haussler gave Kent the go-ahead. In what has been described by other scientists as an almost miraculous feat, Kent took less than a month to write a program, GigAssembler, that allowed the Human Genome Project to assemble and publish the first human genome sequence on June 22, 2000, just a few days before Celera completed theirs.

After UC Santa Cruz published their draft of the human genome online, Kent began programming the UCSC Genome Browser to allow researchers to search 21 tracks of information aligned with the DNA sequence to help them identify genes. The Browser continues to be an important open-source tool for uncovering the causes of disease and develop new treatments.

In 2004, David Haussler became the inaugural member of the Biomolecular Engineering Department at UC Santa Cruz. Today he is the scientific director of the UC Santa Cruz Genomics Institute, as well as the scientific co-director of the California Institute for Quantitative Biosciences (QB3). Jim Kent is currently the director of the UCSC Genome Browser Project and a research scientist with UCSC’s Center for Biomolecular Science & Engineering. The Santa Cruz Genomics Institute continues to be leaders in the field of genomics, with a commitment to open-source research.

== Student demographics ==
=== Undergraduates ===
In the 2018-2019 school year, there were 4,165 undergraduate students associated with the Baskin School of Engineering, 3.1% whom were African American/Black, 42.1% Asian, 15.4% Hispanic/Latino, 0.6% Pacific Islander/Native Hawaiian, 26.1% white, and 9.8% international. Women make up 21% of the undergraduate population in the Baskin School, while men make up 78%.

=== Graduates ===
For the 2018-2019 school year, there were 562 graduate students associated with the Baskin School of Engineering, 1.7% of whom were African American/Black, 11.7% Asian, 6.3% Hispanic or Latino, 24.3% of White, and 48.3% international. The graduate population of Baskin Engineering is 28% female, and 71% male.

== Centers and institutes ==
=== Centers ===
Research centers within the Baskin School of Engineering include

- W.M. Keck Center for Adaptive Optical Microscopy
- Center for Biomolecular Science and Engineering (CBSE)
- Center for Games and Playable Media
- Center for Information Technology Research in the Interest of Society (CITRIS)
- W.M. Keck Center for Nanoscale Optofluidics
- Center for Research in Open Source Software (CROSS)
- Center for Research in Storage Systems (CRSS)
- Center For Sustainable Energy And Power Systems (CenSEPS)
- Cyber-Physical Systems Research Center (CPSRC)
- Data, Discovery and Decisions (D3) Research Center
- Storage Systems Research Center (SSRC)

=== Institutes ===
Research institutes within the Baskin School of Engineering include

- California Institute for Quantitative Biosciences (QB3)
- Institute for the Biology of Stem Cells (IBSC)
- Institute For Scalable Scientific Data Management (ISSDM)
- UC Santa Cruz Genomics Institute

== Deans ==
- Founding Dean: Patrick E. Mantey, July 1997- December 2000
- Sung Mo "Steve" Kang, January 2001- February 2007
- Acting Dean: Michael S. Isaaccson, January 2006- June 2006, March 2007-April 2009
- Arthur P. Ramirez, May 2009-June 2014
- Interim Dean: Joseph P. Konopelski, July 2014-June 2016
- Alexander Wolf, 2016–present

== Connection to Silicon Valley ==
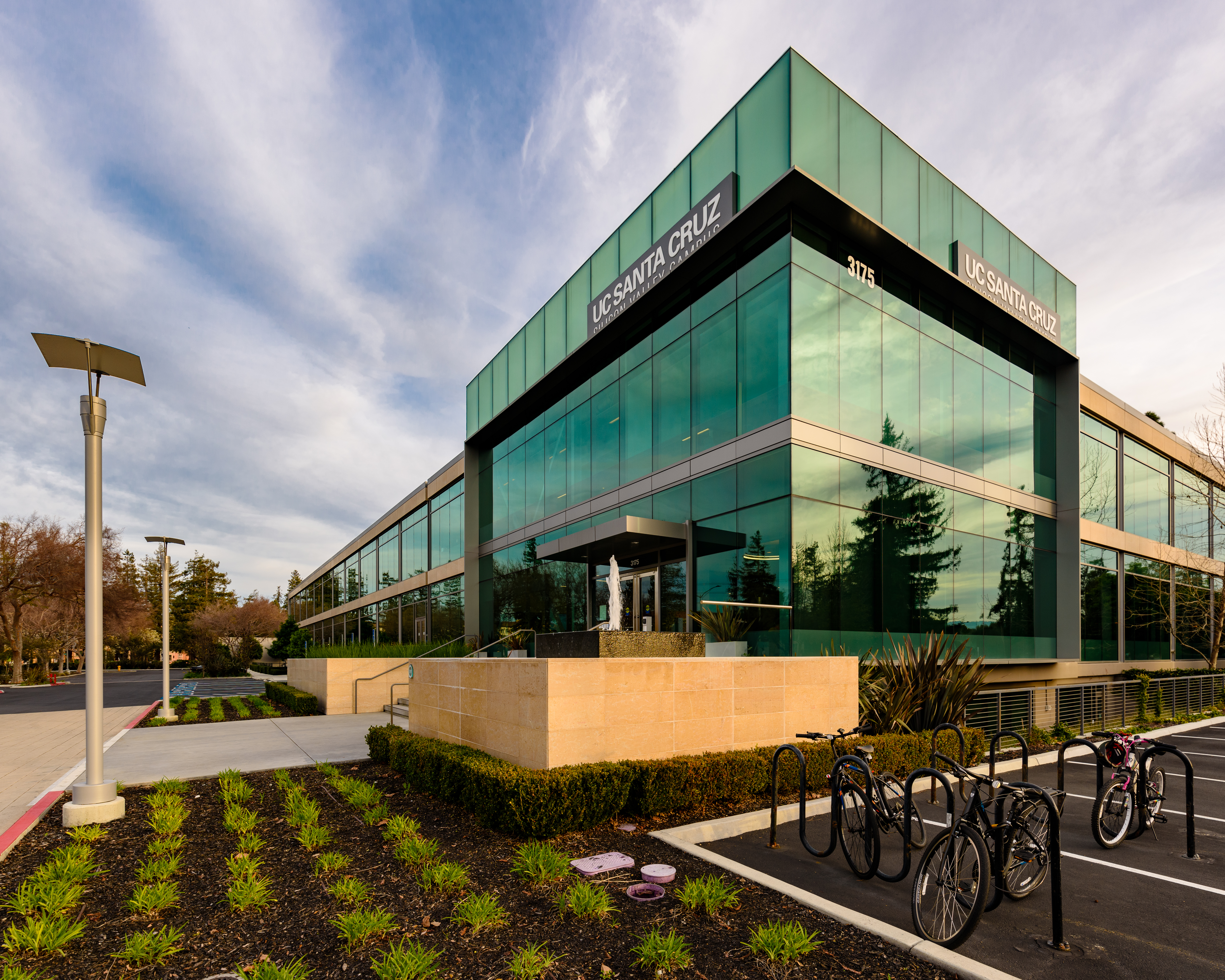
The Silicon Valley satellite campus of the University of California, Santa Cruz.

The main UC Santa Cruz campus is located just thirty miles from one of the largest global centers of technology and innovation in the Silicon Valley and has spent decades cultivating relationships with industry leaders in the area through its Silicon Valley Initiatives. Faculty and students regularly collaborate with industry on research projects, which has led to many students getting internships and permanent jobs at leading companies, including Amazon, Apple, Google, and Facebook. Business Insider has ranked UC Santa Cruz one of the top twenty schools to land a person a job in the Silicon Valley.

The Baskin School of Engineering conducts classes, career training, and professional development programs at the UC Santa Cruz Silicon Valley satellite campus located on Bowers Avenue in Santa Clara, California to further facilitate relationships between university researchers and industry leaders. The satellite campus currently houses a professional masters program in games and playable media, a distance education site for some BSOE graduate level courses, shared satellite offices for BSOE faculty, the BSOE corporate development staff offices, and a shared office for BSOE administration and BSOE local IT staff support. The Santa Clara location opened in April 2016 and is the co-location of the UCSC Extension and UCSC Silicon Valley Academic Operations.

== Facilities ==
The Baskin School of Engineering is housed in the Jack Baskin Engineering building, located on High Street at the north-most end of the UC Santa Cruz main campus. The structure was completed in 1971 and was originally the Applied Sciences Building before the engineering department was formed in the 1990s. In the summer of 2004, UC Santa Cruz completed construction on a 212-seat Baskin Engineering Auditorium and 150,000-square-foot (14,000 m^{2}) Engineering 2 building to provide more space for the growing department, right across from the original engineering building. The Physical Sciences Building began providing additional space for biomolecular engineering programs and groundbreaking for a new Biomedical Sciences Building began in 2010.

In 2019, the UCSC Genomics Institute, an Organized Research Unit (ORU) based in the Baskin School of Engineering, moved to a new facility at 2300 Delaware on the west side of Santa Cruz, and were later joined by Baskin Engineering labs that work with smart power and robotics/motion-capture. The facility, known now as the Westside Research Park, is an enormous complex with three buildings encompassing 240,000 gross square feet of space. It is located three blocks from Natural Bridges State Beach and includes state-of-the-art clean rooms, office space, loading docks, luncheon areas, and a thirty-foot tall, net-enclosed arena to provide airspace for robotics testing.

== Startups and spinoffs ==
Research conducted at the Baskin School of Engineering has led to the development of a number of new technologies that are currently being used in industry, medicine, and security. Students and faculty have engaged in collaborative research projects with industry partners at companies such as Adobe Inc., Amazon, Apple Inc., eBay, Facebook, Google, Hewlett-Packard, Microsoft, and IBM. Affiliates of the Baskin School of Engineering have also gone on to develop a number of startups and companies, some of which have spun off directly from technologies they researched and developed at the university.

=== Companies founded by professors ===
Companies founded by professors at Baskin Engineering include

- Astrea Forensics
- Dovetail Genomics
- Fluxus
- HiPic
- Maverix Biomics
- MagArray
- Pinpoint Science
- Rulai

=== Companies founded by students, alumni, and postdocs ===
Companies founded by students, alumni, and postdoctoral researchers at Baskin Engineering include

- Aether Biomachines
- Alphonso Inc
- Brilliant Smart Home Technologies
- Ceph
- ClaretBio
- Cloudflare
- Code Naturally
- Concur Technologies
- Confluent Inc
- CruzFoam
- Digital Nest
- eGain
- Five3 Genomics
- Ontera (Formally Two Pore Guys)
- Pure Storage
- Shopkick
- Realtime
- UpVoice
- Vibrado Technologies
- WhoWhere?
