= NCPC =

NCPC may refer to:

- National Capital Planning Commission, a U.S. government agency that provides planning guidance for Washington, D.C
- National Counterproliferation Center, the primary organization within the U.S. Intelligence Community for combating the spread of weapons of mass destruction and their delivery systems
- National Collegiate Pickleball Championship, United States
- National Crop Protection Center, a Philippine research organization
- National Crime Prevention Council, an American educational nonprofit organization in Washington, DC
- Nicotine and Cannabis Policy Center, a government funded policy center at the University of California, Merced
- North China Pharmaceutical Group Corp, a leading pharmaceutical manufacturer in China
- North Coast Parish Church, a church part of Reay Parish Church
- Northern Canada Power Commission, a former Canadian government-owned electric utility

== See also ==
- NCPC-7, an aircraft developed for the Swiss Air Force
