= Juan Sánchez Muñoz =

American academic administrator

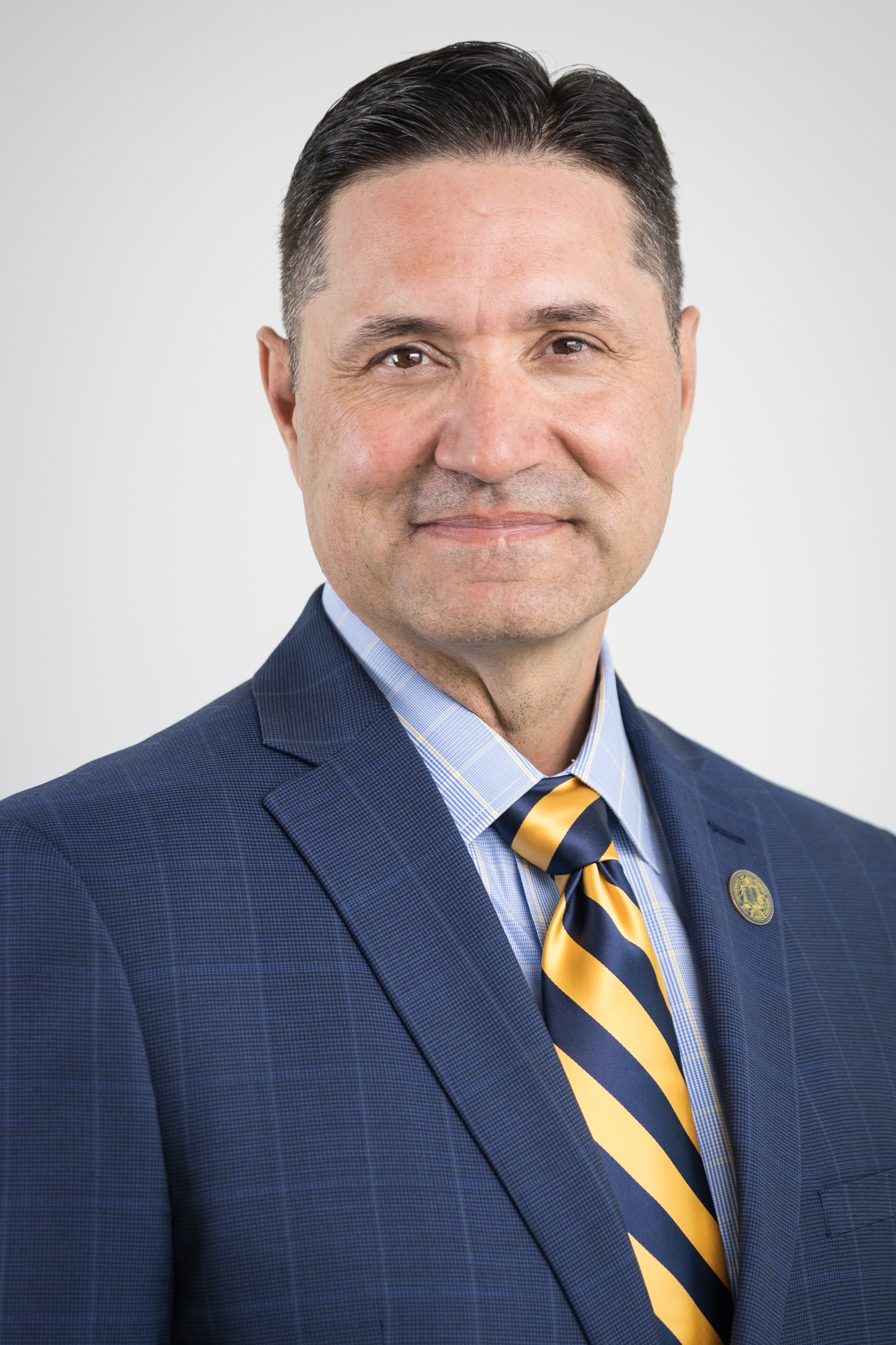
- Muñoz in 2020

4th Chancellor of the University of California, Merced
- Incumbent
- Assumed office 2020
- Preceded by: Dorothy Leland

19th President of University of Houston-Downtown
- In office 2017–2020

Personal details
- Education: University of California, Santa Barbara (BA, psychology); California State University, Los Angeles (MA, Latin American studies); University of California, Los Angeles (PhD, education)

Military service
- Branch/service: United States Marine Corps
- Years of service: 1986–1992 (reserve)
- Rank: Sergeant
- Battles/wars: Operation Desert Storm
- Awards: National Defense Service Medal

Academic background
- Thesis: Re-examining the margins of public education: New models of analysis of alternative education for at -risk students (2001)
- Doctoral advisors: Peter McLaren; Kris Gutiérrez

Academic work
- Discipline: Education
- Institutions: California State University, Fullerton; East Los Angeles College; Pacific Oaks College; Whittier College; University of Houston–Downtown; University of California, Merced

Juan Sánchez Muñoz (born 1967) is the fourth chancellor of the University of California, Merced. He is the school's first Latino/Hispanic chancellor. Previously, he served as president of the University of Houston - Downtown.

Sánchez Muñoz is the son of farm workers, and a California native.

Sánchez Muñoz serves on the boards of directors for a variety of community and nonprofit organizations, including Excelencia in Education, the Gallo Center for the Arts, the Bay Area Council, and the Yosemite Conservancy. He has served on the California Governors Council for Post-Secondary Education, on the Fresno K-16 Collaborative, which aims to increase the number of undergraduate/graduate degrees earned by residents in the Greater Fresno area.

Muñoz served in the United States Marine Corp Reserves, and was honorably discharged with the rank of sergeant.
