= SciGenom Labs =

- Company type: Private company
- Industry: Genomics and R&D
- Founded: Kochi, Kerala – India (2009)
- Founder: Sam Santhosh
- Headquarters: Kochi, India
- Number of locations: Kochi, Bangalore, Chennai, Hyderabad, U.S.A
- Website: www.scigenom.com

SciGenom Labs is a genomics company with facilities in Kochi, India and USA (San Francisco) functioning as a Genomics incubator. They are certified NABL, ISO and DSIR-GoI recognised. Started in 2009 by Sam Santhosh, the company has over 100 employees spread across its facilities. Units incubated and spun off from SciGenom include MedGenome, a molecular diagnostics testing company with labs in Narayana Heath City (NH) and QB3 Bio (San Francisco), AgriGenome, a company leveraging genomics for breeding better crops with labs in Hyderabad and Kochi, Saksin LifeSciences Private Limited, a drug development company with a biobetter molecule for AMD, based in Chennai and MagGenome a bio-nanotech company with nucelci acid extraction products using non-coated magnetics nanoparticles, based in Chennai and Kochi. SGRF (SciGenom Research Foundation) is a non-profit organization supported by SciGenom, which conducts international conferences every year with major research institutions across India and has a medicinal plant garden called 'Hortus Malabaricus' in Cheruthrurthy, Kerala, India.

== Publications ==
1. Tirumurugaan Krishnaswamy Gopalan.; Pradheepa Gururaj.; Ravi Gupta.; Dhinakar Raj Gopal.; Preeti Rajesh.; Balachandran Chidambaram.; Aravindan Kalyanasundaram.; Raja Angamuthu. (June 2014). "Transcriptome Profiling Reveals Higher Vertebrate Orthologous of Intra-Cytoplasmic Pattern Recognition Receptors in Grey Bamboo Shark". PLoS ONE 9(6): e100018.doi:10.1371/journal.pone.0100018.
2. Ekici.; Halime.; Rao, S.; Sönnerborg, A.; Ramprasad, V.L.; Gupta, R.; Neogi, U. (Nov 2014)."Cost-efficient HIV-1 drug resistance surveillance using multiplexed high throughput amplicon sequencing: Implications for use in low and middle income countries". Inst för laboratoriemedicin / Dept of Laboratory Medicine.ISBN 978-91-7549-599-6.doi: 2014-05-21.
3. Poulter, J.A.; Al-Araimi, M.; Conte, I.; van Genderen, M.M.; Sheridan, E.; Carr, I.M.; Parry, D.A.; Shires, M.; Carrella, S.; Bradbury, J.; Khan, K.; Lakeman, P.; Sergouniotis, P.I.; Webster, A.R.; Moore, A.T.; Pal, B.; Mohamed, M.D.; Venkataramana, A.; Ramprasad, V.; Shetty, R.; Saktivel, M.; Kumaramanickavel, G.; Tan, A.; Mackey, D.A.; Hewitt, A.W.; Banfi, S.; Ali, M.; Inglehearn, C.F.; Toomes, C.(Nov 2013). "Recessive mutations in SLC38A8 cause foveal hypoplasia and optic nerve misrouting without albinism". Am J Hum Genet.93(6):1143–50. doi: 10.1016/j.ajhg.2013.11.002.
4. Ravi Gupta.; Aakrosh Ratan.; Changanamkandath Rajesh.; Rong Chen.; Hie Lim Kim.; Richard Burhans.; Webb Miller.; Sam Santhosh.; Ramana V Davuluri.; Atul J Butte.; Stephan C Schuster.; Somasekar Seshagiri.; George Thomas.(August 2012).“Sequencing and analysis of a South Asian-Indian personal genome”. BMC Genomics 2012 13:440. doi:10.1186/1471-2164-13-440.
