= Carl E. Walsh =

American economist

- Born: June 30, 1949 (age 77)

Academic background
- Education: University of California, Berkeley
- Website: Information at IDEAS / RePEc

Carl Eugene Walsh (born June 30, 1949) is an American economist. He has been an economics professor at the University of California, Santa Cruz (UCSC) since 1987, and retired in 2020 as Distinguished Professor of Economics. He twice served as chair of the Economics Department at the university (1988-1991 and 2010–2013) as well as Vice Provost for Silicon Valley Initiatives (2005–2007) and Associate Vice Chancellor for Planning and Programs (1995-1995) at UCSC. He has also been a Visiting Scholar at the Federal Reserve Banks of Kansas City (1982–1983), Philadelphia (1984–1985) and San Francisco (1987–2000).

Walsh's work is primarily in the fields of central banking and monetary policy.

== Early life and education ==
Walsh received B.A. degrees in mathematics and economics in 1971 and his Ph.D. in economics in 1976, both from the University of California, Berkeley.

== Career ==
Walsh was a lecturer at the University of Auckland in New Zealand from 1976 to 1978 and assistant professor at Princeton University from 1979 to 1985. Walsh was senior economist at the Federal Reserve Bank of San Francisco from 1985 to 1987. Walsh moved to the University of California, Santa Cruz in 1987, becoming associate professor. Walsh was named full professor in 1991 and was named distinguished professor in 2010.

Walsh has held visiting appointments at several institutions, including UC Berkeley economics department (visiting lecturer, 1979; visiting assistant professor, 1985), the Federal Reserve Bank of Kansas City (visiting scholar, 1982–1983), the International Finance Division of the Federal Reserve Board (visiting scholar, July 1984), the Federal Reserve Bank of Philadelphia (visiting senior economist, 1984–1985), the UC Berkeley School of Business (visiting lecturer, 1986–1987), the Federal Reserve Bank of San Francisco (visiting scholar, 1987–present), and Stanford University (visiting professor, fall 1995). Walsh was vice provost of the UC Santa Cruz's Silicon Valley Initiatives from 2005 to 2007. He was a member of the editorial board of the American Economic Review (1994–2000) and was a co-editor of the International Journal of Central Banking (2008–2012).

Walsh is an international research fellow at Kiel Institute for the World Economy and was an Honorary Adviser to the Bank of Japan's Institute for Monetary and Economic Studies from 2019 to 2023.

== Work ==
Walsh has become best known for his paper "Optimal Contracts for Central Bankers," published in 1995 in the American Economic Review. His theory is commonly referred to as the "Walsh Contract." In a 2004 speech, former Chairman of the Federal Reserve Ben S. Bernanke included "Optimal Contracts for Central Bankers" as one of the three most influential papers in macroeconomics over the past 25 years. His theory has also been questioned by Francisco Candel-Sánchez and Juan Cristóbal Campoy-Miñarro. In addition, Haizhou Huang and A. Jorge Padilla have commented on the concept.

== Selected publications ==
Walsh has written several textbooks and has authored or coauthored numerous articles and chapters, mostly scientific.

- "Optimal Contracts for Central Bankers," March 1995, Vol. 85, No. 1, pp. 150–167. American Economic Review. Origins of the "Walsh Contract."
- Monetary Theory and Policy, 3rd edition, 2010. MIT Press. ISBN 0-262-01377-0. Standard graduate-level textbook for monetary economics.
- Economics, 4th edition, with Joseph E. Stiglitz, 2006. W. W. Norton. ISBN 0-393-92622-2. Modern introductory economics textbook.
- Principle of Microeconomics, 4th edition, with Joseph E. Stiglitz, 2006. W. W. Norton. ISBN 0-393-92623-0. Modern introductory microeconomics textbook.
