= Excelencia in Education =

American non-profit research organization

- Formation: January 2004
- Founder: Sarita E. Brown and Deborah A. Santiago
- Type: 501(c)(3)
- Headquarters: Washington DC, United States
- Website: edexcelencia.org

Excelencia in Education, also referred to as Excelencia, is an American non-profit organization founded in 2004 by Sarita E. Brown and Deborah A. Santiago. It is classified as a Research Institute and Public Policy Analysis group focused on Educational Institutions. Excelencia's stated mission is to "accelerate Latino student success in higher education". Excelencia's research is conducted to gather information on the relationship between Latino students and their programs, and is published through Education Resources Information Center (ERIC), and educational journals, such as Insight into Diversity and Diverse: Issues in Higher Education. Excelencia regularly recognizes programs and institutions that support the Latino community through higher education. Excelencia publishes an annual list of Hispanic Serving Institutions and emerging Hispanic Serving Institutions.

== History ==
Brown and Santiago founded Excelencia in Education in Washington D.C. Brown is a national education policy advisor and former Executive Director of the White House Initiative on Educational Excellence for Hispanic Americans. Santiago is a higher education policy and data specialist and former Deputy Director of the White House Initiative on Educational Excellence for Hispanic Americans. Excelencia is funded through a variety of grants, contracts, events, and gifts; in 2019, Excelencia received funding from the Bill and Melinda Gates Foundation, Andrew Mellon Foundation, Ascendium Education Group, and MacKenzie Scott

== Seal of Excelencia ==
Since 2019, Excelencia has offered, to higher education institutions in the United States, which "serve Latino students". The Seal acts as a certification from Excelencia that the institution helps Latino access resources like mentoring and financial accountability. Among the recipients of the Seal in 2022 was El Paso Community College, noted for its work on serving Latino communities.

There are 46 institutions that have earned the Seal of Excelencia in the 2024 classification:

Seal of Excelencia Certified Institutions (2024)
Institution	Control	Duration	City	State
Angelo State University	Public	4-year	San Angelo	TX
Arizona State University	Public	4-year	Tempe	AZ
Austin Community College District	Public	2-year	Austin	TX
California State University Channel Islands	Public	4-year	Camarillo	CA
California State University, East Bay	Public	4-year	Hayward	CA
California State University, Fresno	Public	4-year	Fresno	CA
California State University, Fullerton	Public	4-year	Fullerton	CA
California State University, Long Beach	Public	4-year	Long Beach	CA
California State University, Los Angeles	Public	4-year	Los Angeles	CA
California State University, Northridge	Public	4-year	Northridge	CA
California State University, Sacramento	Public	4-year	Sacramento	CA
California State University, San Bernardino	Public	4-year	San Bernardino	CA
California State University, San Marcos	Public	4-year	San Marcos	CA
Cerritos College	Public	2-year	Norwalk	CA
El Paso Community College	Public	2-year	El Paso	TX
Florida International University	Public	4-year	Miami	FL
Grand Valley State University	Public	4-year	Allendale	MI
Hartnell College	Public	2-year	Salinas	CA
Long Beach City College	Public	2-year	Long Beach	CA
Mercy University	Private	4-year	Dobbs Ferry	NY
Metropolitan State University of Denver	Public	4-year	Denver	CO
Miami Dade College	Public	2-year	Miami	FL
Phoenix College	Public	2-year	Phoenix	AZ
Pima Community College	Public	2-year	Tucson	AZ
Richard J. Daley College	Public	2-year	Chicago	IL
San Antonio College	Public	2-year	San Antonio	TX
San Diego State University	Public	4-year	San Diego	CA
San Francisco State University	Public	4-year	San Francisco	CA
South Texas College	Public	2-year	McAllen	TX
St. Edward's University	Private	4-year	Austin	TX
Sul Ross State University	Public	4-year	Alpine	TX
Texas State University	Public	4-year	San Marcos	TX
Texas Woman's University	Public	4-year	Denton	TX
University at Albany	Public	4-year	Albany	NY
University of Arizona	Public	4-year	Tucson	AZ
University of California, Merced	Public	4-year	Merced	CA
University of California, Riverside	Public	4-year	Riverside	CA
University of California, Santa Cruz	Public	4-year	Santa Cruz	CA
University of Central Florida	Public	4-year	Orlando	FL
University of Illinois Chicago	Public	4-year	Chicago	IL
University of Texas at Arlington	Public	4-year	Arlington	TX
University of Texas at Austin	Public	4-year	Austin	TX
University of Texas at El Paso	Public	4-year	El Paso	TX
University of Texas at San Antonio	Public	4-year	San Antonio	TX
University of Texas Rio Grande Valley	Public	4-year	Edinburg	TX
Wilbur Wright College	Public	2-year	Chicago	IL

== Recognition ==
- 2021 Presidential Medal by the Association for the Study of Higher Education (ASHE)
- 2019 "Modelo de la Comunidad Award" from College Board
