= Sung-Mo Kang =

Korean American electrical engineer

Sung-Mo "Steve" Kang

15th President of KAIST
- In office 2013–2017
- Preceded by: Nam-Pyo Suh
- Succeeded by: Sung-Chul Shin

2nd Chancellor of the University of California, Merced
- In office 2007–2011
- Preceded by: Carol Tomlinson-Keasey
- Succeeded by: Dorothy Leland

Personal details
- Born: Gyeonggi Province, South Korea
- Citizenship: United States
- Scientific career
- Education: Fairleigh Dickinson University (B.S.); University at Buffalo (M.S.); University of California, Berkeley (Ph.D.)
- Known for: Modeling and simulation of semiconductor devices and circuits
- Awards: The Silicon Valley Engineering Hall of Fame in 2009; ISQED Quality Award (2008); Chang-Lin Tien Education Leadership Award (2007); IEEE Mac Van Valkenburg Award (2005); IEEE Fellow; AAAS Fellow
- Fields: Electrical Engineering
- Workplaces: University of Illinois at Urbana–Champaign; University of California, Santa Cruz; University of California, Merced
- Thesis: On the Modeling of Some Classes of Nonlinear Devices and Systems (1975)
- Doctoral advisor: Leon O. Chua

Sung-Mo "Steve" Kang is an American electrical engineering scientist, professor, writer, inventor, entrepreneur and 15th president of KAIST. Kang was appointed as the second chancellor of the University of California, Merced in 2007. He was the first department head of foreign origin at the electrical and computer engineering department at the University of Illinois at Urbana-Champaign and Dean of the Baskin School of Engineering at UC Santa Cruz. Kang teaches and has written extensively in the field of computer-aided design for electronic circuits and systems. Kang has led the development of the world’s first 32-bit microprocessor chips as a technical supervisor at AT&T Bell Laboratories and designed satellite-based private communication networks as a member of technical staff. Kang holds 15 U.S. patents and has won numerous awards for his ground breaking achievements in the field of electrical engineering.

He was president of the IEEE Circuits and Systems Society, founding editor-in-chief of the IEEE Transactions on VLSI Systems, and an IEEE distinguished lecturer. He was also president of the Silicon Valley Engineering Council and continues to serve on advisory committees for projects in the U.S. and internationally. Also as an entrepreneur, he co-founded a fabless mobile memory chip design company named ZTI, originally in Sunnyvale, now in San Jose.

== Biography ==
=== Background and education ===
Sung-Mo “Steve” Kang was born and raised in Seoul, Korea. Kang is the first in his family to attend college. Kang’s grandfather, who fought for Korean independence and experienced Japanese occupation, helped him to immigrate to the U.S. and study electrical engineering to become a college professor. As a distinguished scholar and a leader in engineering education, Kang has gone beyond this dream.

Kang received his B.S. from Fairleigh Dickinson University in 1970, his M.S. from State University of New York at Buffalo in 1972 and his Ph.D. from University of California at Berkeley in 1975. All his academic degrees are in electrical engineering.

=== Career ===
After his graduation, he has taught at various universities in the U.S., Germany and Switzerland, and worked as a technician and supervisor at AT&T Bell Laboratories in New Jersey. He was a visiting professor at the École Polytechnique Fédérale de Lausanne, the University of Karlsruhe and the Technical University of Munich, and a chaired visiting professor of Electrical Engineering and Computer Science of Korea Advanced Institute of Science and Technology (KAIST). He has also taught at Rutgers University.

Kang joined the University of Illinois at Urbana-Champaign as an associate professor electrical and computer engineering in 1985, and was promoted to professor in 1990. From 1995 to 2000, Kang served as the head of the electrical and computer engineering department at the University of Illinois at Urbana-Champaign; he was the first department head of foreign origin in 110 years. He was honored as the first Charles Marshall Senior University Scholar and directed several research organizations.

From 2001 to 2007, Kang served as dean of the Baskin School of Engineering at UC Santa Cruz. During this time, Kang brought the Baskin School from infancy to its current standing as a well-regarded graduate school of engineering. Since taking the position in 2001, he doubled the size of the faculty, recruiting the highest caliber professors and researchers to the growing school. Federal research funding increased four-fold during Kang’s tenure, from $5 million to $20 million, and the school’s scholarship fund has grown by tenfold. In his six years as dean of engineering, he took a nascent program to significantly higher levels of achievement during its second phase of development.

In 2007, Kang became the second chancellor of the University of California, Merced, succeeding Carol Tomlinson-Keasey. Kang also teaches at the school of engineering as a professor.

Kang was the president of KAIST from 2013 to 2017.

=== Other activities and leadership ===
While at UC Santa Cruz, Kang chaired the UC Santa Cruz Chancellor’s Education Partnership Advisory Committee. He also served on advisory committees for the National Youth Leadership Forum and the Silicon Valley Engineering, Manufacturing and Technology Alliance.

Kang has forged important partnerships with the California Institute for Quantitative Biosciences (QB3), the California Institute for Information Technology Research in the Interest of Society (CITRIS), and NASA's University Affiliated Research Center.

He attracted a $2 million National Science Foundation program for Developing Effective Engineering Pathways (DEEP) for community college students in the Silicon Valley region. He has also served on the advisory boards for UC’s COSMOS and MESA programs.

Kang initiated and established several international programs at UC, including executive programs for managers from Korea and exchange programs with the Swiss Federal Institute of Technology at Lausanne (EPFL), Hokkaido Information University, KAIST, Yonsei University, Konkuk University, Seoul National University, POSTECH, and the Catholic University of Daegu.

== Membership ==
He serves on the UC Merced Foundation as president, the Great Valley Center as chairman of the board, and the Central Valley Higher Education Consortium as an executive board member. Kang is a Foreign Member of the National Academy of Engineering of Korea, a fellow of IEEE, ACM, AAAS, and is listed in Who's Who in America, Who's Who in Technology, Who's Who in Engineering and Who's Who in Midwest.

== Publications ==
Kang has written or co-authored nine books and more than 500 technical papers in the field of electrical engineering.

=== Books ===
- Design Automation for Timing-Driven Layout Synthesis, Kluwer Academic Publishers, 1993
- Hot-Carrier Reliability of MOS VLSI Circuits, Kluwer Academic Publishers, 1993
- Physical Design for Multichip Modules, Kluwer Academic Publishers, 1994
- Modeling of Electrical Overstress in Integrated Circuits, Kluwer Academic Publishers, 1994
- CMOS Digital Integrated Circuits: Analysis and Design, McGraw-Hill, 1995
- Computer-Aided Design of Optoelectronic Integrated Circuits and Systems, Prentice-Hall, 1996
- CMOS Digital Integrated Circuits: Analysis and Design, McGraw-Hill, Second Ed., 1999
- Electrothermal Analysis of VLSI Systems, Kluwer Academics, June 2000
- CMOS Digital Integrated Circuits: Analysis and Design, McGraw-Hill, Third Ed., 2002
- CMOS Digital Integrated Circuits: Analysis and Design, McGraw-Hill, Fourth Ed., 2015
