= Shuvo Roy =

American biomedical engineer (born 1969)

- Born: 10 November 1969 (age 56); Dhaka
- Citizenship: United States
- Education: Mount Union College; Case Western Reserve University
- Known for: Co-invention of an implantable artificial kidney, medical MEMS
- Scientific career
- Fields: Bioengineering, Biomedical MEMS, Pediatric Devices
- Workplaces: University of California, San Francisco
- Doctoral advisor: Mehran Mehregany

Shuvo Roy is an American biomedical engineer known for his work with Bio-MEMS including the invention of an artificial kidney. He currently serves as a professor at the Department of Bioengineering and Therapeutic Sciences, University of California, San Francisco.

== Early life and education ==
Shuvo Roy was born on 10 November 1969 in Dhaka (now in Bangladesh) to Asoke Nath Roy, a public health physician, and Ratna Roy, a teacher. His grandfather Nagen Dey was a professor of English at Sir Ashutosh Mukherjee College, Boalkhali. He hails from Chittagong Division, his paternal family being from Rosangiri in Fatikchhari and his maternal family being from Alkaran Ward.

Roy started his elementary education in Siddheswari in Dhaka but moved with his father, mother and siblings to Uganda in 1974 where he received most of his education including at the Jinja Senior Secondary School (his mother being employed at the institution).

Roy obtained a scholarship to go to the United States and earn his BS degree from University of Mount Union, Ohio in 1992, where he majored in Physics, Mathematics, and Computer Science. He then earned his MS degree in Electrical Engineering and Applied Physics from Case Western Reserve University in Cleveland, Ohio in 1995. He went on to earn his PhD degree in Electrical Engineering and Computer Science from the same school in 2001.

== Career ==
Roy has developed silicon nanopore membranes (SNM) to achieve high-efficiency blood ultrafiltration while selectively retaining specific solutes and serving as an immunoprotective barrier for encapsulated cells. The SNM are the fundamental underlying technology for the development of an implantable bioartificial kidney.

Using this technology, he has shown feasibility for an implantable bioartificial pancreas (iBAP). Previous attempts to develop a bioartificial pancreas have been severely limited by insufficient mass transfer and a limited supply of beta cells, but Roy says that ultra-high hydraulic permeability characteristic of the SNM will enable appropriate mass transport (especially oxygen, glucose, and insulin) to achieve optimal beta cell performance, while the ultra-selective pore characteristic of the SNM enable unprecedented immunoisolation. Also, the iBAP can utilize a human stem cell derived fully functional beta cell that provides and unlimited supply of beta cells.

He is a founding member of the University of California, San Francisco Pediatric Device Consortium.

=== Professional positions ===
- 1998–2002 Project Staff, Department of Biomedical Engineering, Cleveland Clinic
- 1998–2008 Co-Director, BioMEMS Laboratory, Cleveland Clinic
- 2000–2008 Faculty, Spine Research Laboratory, Cleveland Clinic
- 2001–2008 Assistant Professor, Applied Biomedical Engineering Program, Cleveland State University
- 2001–2008 Clinical Assistant Professor, Department of Electrical Engineering and Computer Science, Case Western Reserve University
- 2002–2008 Assistant Staff, Department of Biomedical Engineering, Cleveland Clinic
- 2006–2008 Assistant Professor, Department of Molecular Medicine, Cleveland Clinic Lerner College of Medicine, Case Western Reserve University
- 2009-2011 Adjunct Associate Staff, Departments of Nephrology and Biomedical Engineering, Cleveland Clinic
- 2008-2013 Associate Professor, Department of Bioengineering and Therapeutic Sciences, University of California, San Francisco
- 2013-now Professor, Department of Bioengineering and Therapeutic Sciences, University of California, San Francisco
- Faculty affiliate of the California Institute for Quantitative Biosciences.
- Director and Principal Investigator, Biomedical Microdevices Laboratory, University of California, San Francisco

== Book chapters ==
- M. Mehregany and S. Roy, "Introduction to MEMS", in Microengineering for Aerospace Systems, H. Helvajian, Ed., Aerospace Press, Los Angeles, CA, USA, 1999
- S. Roy, L.A. Ferrara, A.J. Fleischman, and E.C. Benzel, "MEMS and Neurosurgery", in Encyclopedia of BioMEMS and Bionanotechnology – Volume III: BioMEMS and Biomedical Nanotechnology, T.A. Desai, S. Bhatia, and M. Ferrari, Eds., Springer, New York, NY, USA, 2006
- W.H. Fissell, S. Roy, A.J. Fleischman, and H.D. Humes, “Cell Therapy of Renal Failure”, in Cell Therapy, D. Garcia-Olmo, J.M. Garcia-Verdugo, J. Alemany, and J.A. Gutierrez-Fuentes, Eds., McGraw-Hill, Madrid, SPAIN, 2008
- A.J. Fleischman, S. Srivanas, C. Chandrana, and S. Roy, “Miniature High Frequency Focused Ultrasonic Transducers for Minimally Invasive Imaging Procedures”, in Biomedical Applications of Electroactive Polymer Actuators, F. Carpi and E. Smela, Eds., John Wiley and Sons, Chichester, West Sussex, UK, 2009

== Honors and awards ==
- 2003 MIT TR100 Award, Top 100 Young Innovators, Technology Review Magazine
- 2004 NASA Group Achievement Award, Harsh Environment MEMS
- Harry Wm. and Diana V. Hind Distinguished Professorship in Pharmaceutical Sciences II in the University of California, San Francisco School of Pharmacy.
- KidneyX Redesign Dialysis prize.
