= Artificial kidney =

Kidney other than the natural organ

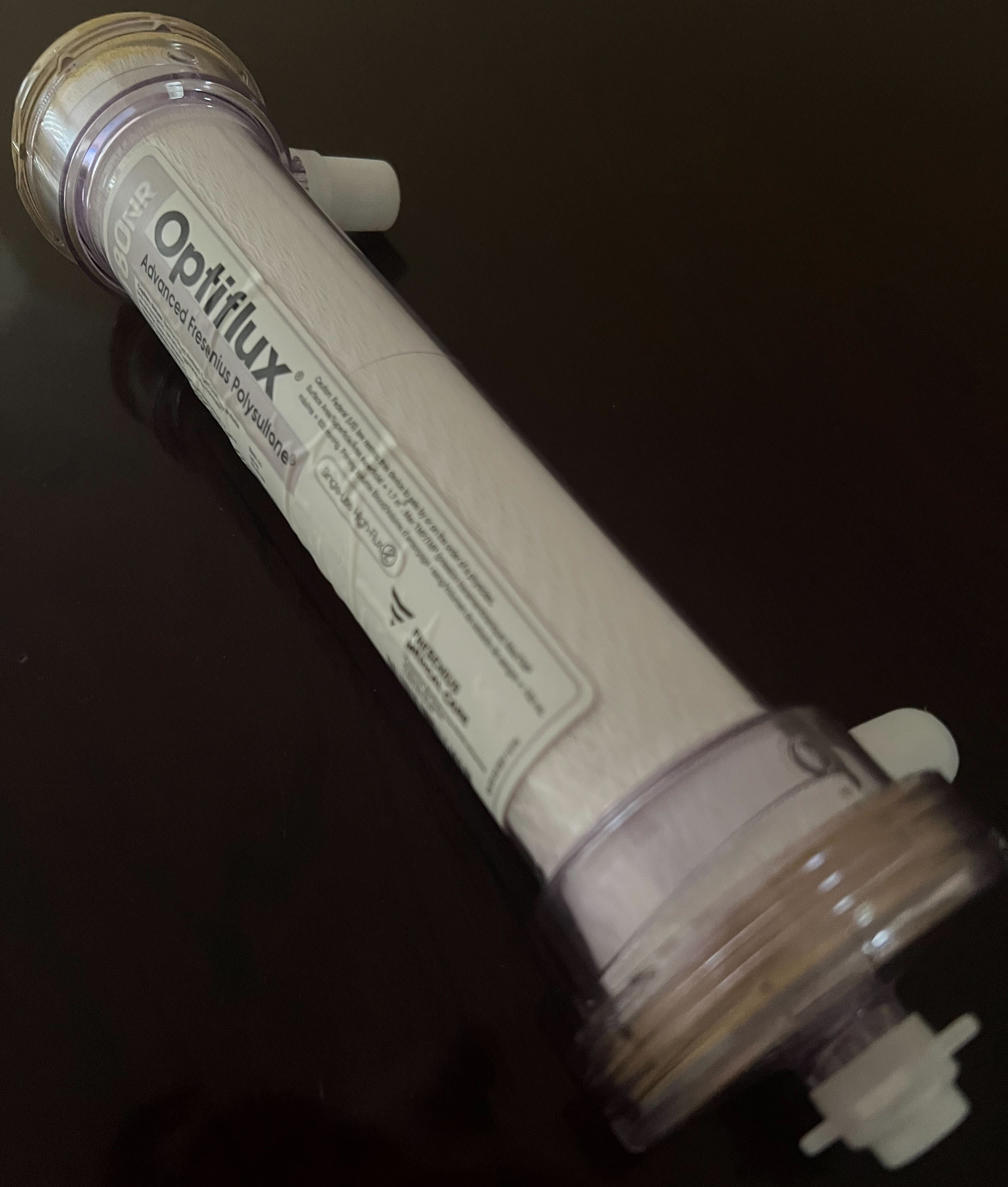
A representative hollow fiber hemodialyzer

Artificial kidney is often a synonym for hemodialyzer, but may also refer to the other renal replacement therapies (with exclusion of kidney transplantation) that are in use and/or in development. This article deals mainly with bio-artificial kidneys featuring cells that are grown from renal cell lines/renal tissue.

The first successful artificial kidney was developed by Willem Kolff in the Netherlands during the early 1940s: Kolff was the first to construct a working dialyzer in 1943.

Some of the commercial artificial kidney manufacturing companies are Care AG, Asahi Kasei, Medtronic, Vantive, Nipro, Fresenius among many others.

== Medical uses ==
=== Kidney failure ===
Kidneys are paired vital organs located behind the abdominal cavity at the bottom of the ribcage corresponding to the levels T12-L3 of the spine vertebrae. They perform about a dozen physiologic functions and are fairly easily damaged. Some of these functions include filtration and excretion of metabolic waste products, regulation of necessary electrolytes and fluids and stimulation of red blood cell-production. These organs routinely filter about 100 to 140 liters of blood a day to produce 1 to 2 litres of urine, composed of wastes and excess fluid.

Kidney failure results in the slow accumulation of nitrogenous wastes, salts, water, and disruption of the body's normal pH balance. This failure typically occurs over a long period of time, and when the patient's renal function declines enough over the course of the disease, is commonly known as end stage renal disease (ESRD; which is also known as Level 5 or 6 kidney disease, depending on whether dialysis or renal replacement therapy is used). Detecting kidney disease before the kidneys start to shut down is uncommon, with high blood pressure and decreased appetite being symptoms that indicate a problem. Diabetes and high blood pressure are seen as the 2 most common causes of kidney failure. Experts predict that the demand for dialysis will increase as the prevalence of diabetes increases. Until the Second World War, kidney failure generally meant death for the patient. Several insights into kidney function and acute kidney failure were made during the war.

One in three American adults are at a risk for developing kidney disease. Over 35.5 million American adults have kidney disease and most are not aware of it. More than 808,000 of them have kidney failure and 557,000 are on dialysis. The large population of individuals with kidney failure drives continuing advancements in the technology of artificial kidneys so that more people can have access to treatments.

Home hemodialysis has become rare because of its disadvantages. It is expensive, time-consuming and space inefficient. In 1980, 9.7% of the dialysis population was on home hemodialysis but by 1987 the proportion had dropped to 3.6%.

According to a 2011 report by the Organization for Economic Cooperation and Development, the United States of America has the second-highest rate of dialysis among advanced countries after Japan. The United States has the highest mortality rate among patients with ESRD. On average 20% of American ESRD patients die annually, which is more than twice that of Japan. The growth of dialysis facilities in the United States is the result of more Americans developing end-stage renal disease. From 2001 to 2011 the number increased by about 49.7% from 411,000 citizens to 615,000 citizens. In 2001 there were only 296,000 Americans on some form of dialysis. Ten years later that number increased to more than 430,000 as a result of chronic conditions developing such as diabetes and hypertension.

=== Need for a bioartificial kidney ===
Over 300,000 Americans are dependent on hemodialysis as treatment for kidney failure, but according to data from the 2005 USRDS 452,000 Americans have end-stage kidney disease (ESKD). Intriguing investigations from groups in London, Ontario and Toronto, Ontario have suggested that dialysis treatments lasting two to three times as long as, and delivered more frequently than, conventional thrice weekly treatments may be associated with improved clinical outcomes. Implementing six-times weekly, all-night dialysis would overwhelm existing resources in most countries. This, as well as scarcity of donor organs for kidney transplantation has prompted research in developing alternative therapies, including the development of a wearable or implantable device.

== Proposed solutions ==
=== Implantable bioartificial kidney ===
The implantable bioartificial kidney is a project that is being co-developed by a nephrologist named William H. Fissell IV, MD, from the Vanderbilt University Medical Centre with Professor Shuvo Roy, a bioengineer from the University of California, San Francisco. The goal of this project is to create a bio-hybrid device that can remove waste products from the blood stream to keep a patient from needing dialysis or kidney transplant, and also imitate the functions of a healthy kidney, improving QoL and longevity.

The key to the success of this device is the use of silicon nano-pore membrane (SEM) fabricated by MEMS technology similar to the semiconductor manufacturing process. These SEM feature pores that are large enough to allow for fluid and electrolyte transfer, but too small for the immune system to interact with living renal cells contained in the device.

Accordingly, the SEM will not only function as hemo-filters, but as a platform for which living kidney cells can reside and thrive within the unit. These cells can thereby perform the metabolic and endocrine functions of a healthy kidney. By virtue of being protected by the SEM, the kidney cells will remain healthy and viable inside the device. An added benefit of the iBAK is that patients using the device will not need to take lifelong immune suppression drugs as needed by kidney transplant recipients. Also, because the kidney cells in the iBAK will perform hormone regulation functions like a natural kidney, the recipients will be healthier and suffer fewer morbidities than dialysis patients. The device will be designed to be small enough to fit inside a patient's body and will be powered by the natural blood flow. In other words the device requires no batteries, electronics or maintenance. The device will also create urine like a natural kidney and will be connected to the bladder; recipients will regain the ability to urinate naturally.

In 2020, a proof-of-concept experiment showed that the prototype iBAK devices remained blood-clot and rejection free. The prototypes contained human renal cells which stayed healthy for the duration of the 7 day trial implantation in healthy juvenile Yucatan pigs (n=5). Further testing with a greater number of kidney cells in the devices on pigs with kidney failure will be needed to show the bioreactor can perform physiologically similar functions to a natural kidney. Profs. Roy and Fissell and research team continue to make progress and they hope for the device to have completed FDA trials by 2030.

=== Wearable artificial kidney ===
A wearable artificial kidney is a wearable dialysis machine that a person with end-stage kidney disease could use daily or even continuously. A wearable artificial kidney (WAK) is not available, but research teams are in the process of developing such a device. The goal is to develop a portable device that will be able to imitate the functions of the regular kidney. This device would allow for a patient to be treated twenty-four hours a day. With the development of miniature pumps, the hope of an effective wearable hemodialysis device has become realizable. Some patients already receive continuous peritoneal dialysis treatment which allows them to remain ambulatory. However, only a small portion of dialysis patients use peritoneal dialysis treatment because it requires large amounts of dialysate to be stored and disposed. A healthy individual's kidneys filter blood 24 hours/day, 168 hours/week compared to an individual with end-stage renal disease whose dialysis treatment plan is approximately 12 hours a week. The treatment results in a lower quality of life as well as a higher mortality rate for patients with end stage renal disease (ESRD). Therefore, there is a need for an around-the-clock device that will allow ESRD patients to receive dialysis continuously while maintaining a normal life. The FDA approved the first human clinical trial in the United States for a wearable artificial kidney designed by Blood Purification Technologies Inc. The prototype of the WAK is a 10-pound device, powered by nine-volt batteries, which connects to a patient via a catheter, and should use less than 500mL of dialysate. It is designed to run continuously on batteries, allowing patients to remain ambulatory when wearing the device, leading to a greater quality of life. The device is designed to improve other physiological aspects of the patient's health such as improved volume control, decreased hypertension and sodium retention, as well as a decreased rate of cardiovascular disease and stroke.

=== Experiments of the wearable artificial kidney ===
The wearable artificial kidney (WAK) has constantly been modified throughout the years for the better of people who have kidney failure. To try and make the WAK usable, several experiments have been conducted. While conducting these experiments for the WAK, similar goals are trying to be achieved. For example, a main goal that these experiments are trying to achieve is to make sure that the WAK can function like a regular kidney.

One experiment that took place included eight people who wore the WAK for four to eight hours. As the participants wore the WAK, several outcomes occurred. For example, one outcome during the experiment was that the fluid removal for the WAK was controlled correctly by an ultrafiltration pump. Another outcome that took place during this experiment was that a needle connected to the WAK ended up disconnecting itself. When this happened, the WAK was able to recognize this, and the blood stopped pumping. When the blood stopped pumping, the needle could be reinserted without the body losing a large amount of blood. As other research has been conducted, it has been argued that using an ultrafiltration pump may not be the best pump for the WAK. For example, research has found that by using a peristaltic pump instead, would allow a person to know their blood flow rate without having a sensor, which is needed in an ultrafiltration pump used in the experiment mentioned above. A change in the type of pump used for the WAK may be crucial because it could help make the device cheaper and more reliable for the public by not having a sensor.

After a considerable amount of research on the WAK, several research questions have been answered. For example, researchers have found out that the WAK can work without an outlet because it has been able to function on a nine-volt battery. Although, it has been argued by researchers that using nine-volt batteries are not effective enough for the WAK because it does not power the device long enough and indirectly it makes the WAK less affordable when having to constantly change the batteries. Due to this, other energy sources are being explored, for example, researchers are seeing if fuel cells, wireless transmission of energy from an active source, or harvesting energy from the environment would be better ways to power the WAK for longer periods of time. Several questions have been answered about the WAK, but many research questions are still left unanswered. Researchers are still trying to figure out if the WAK can be energy efficient, affordable, and if it can reuse small amounts of dialysate.

== See also ==
- Artificial organ
- Kidney
- Dialysis
- Tissue engineering
- Microelectromechanical systems
- Nanotechnology
- Hemodialysis
- Hemofiltration
