= Gunjan Sinha =

Indian-American entrepreneur and business executive

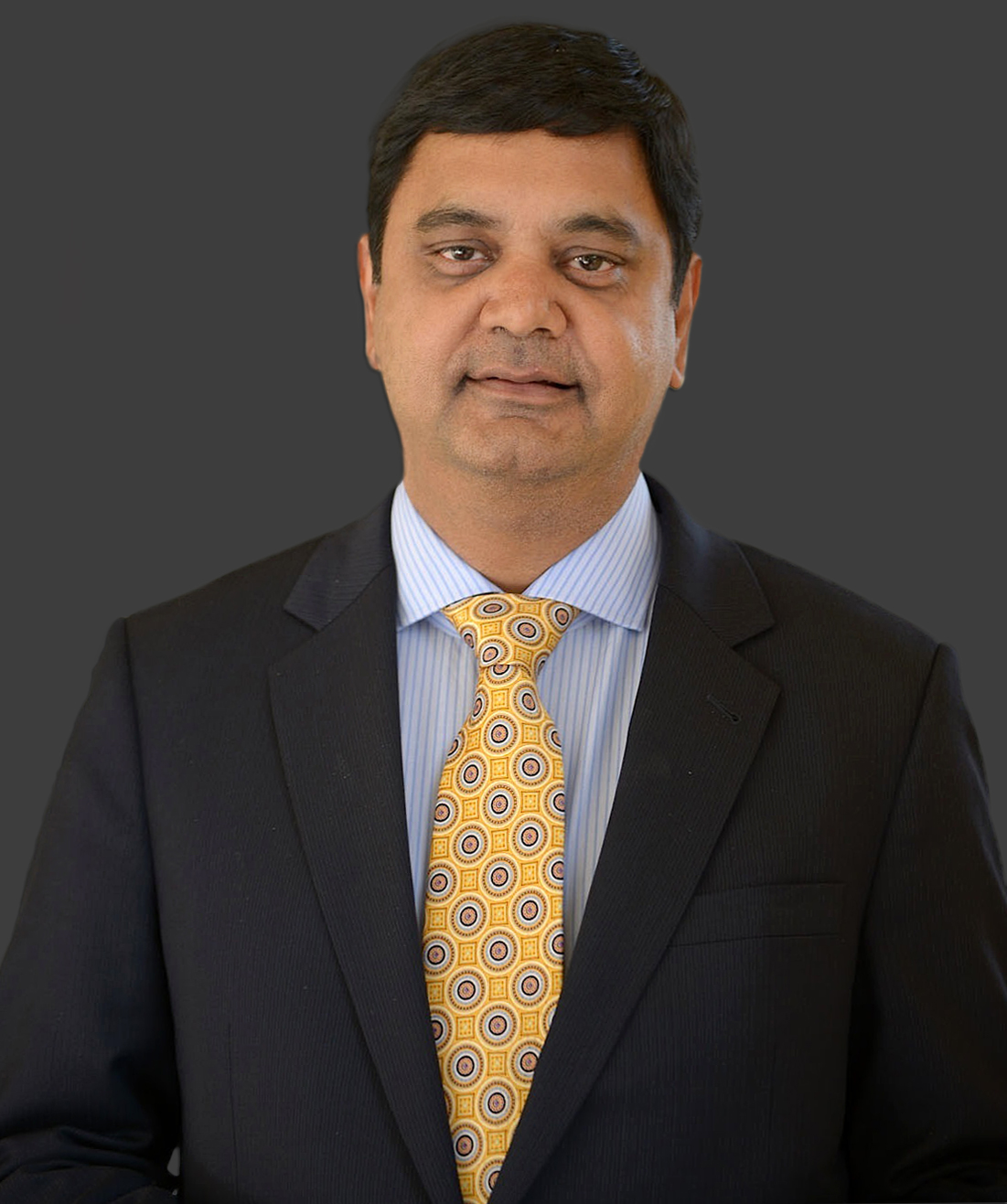
- Born: May 24, 1967 (age 59); Ranchi, India
- Education: Indian Institutes of Technology, University of California, Santa Cruz
- Occupations: Entrepreneur, business executive
- Known for: Executive Chairman, MetricStream and Co-Founder WhoWhere?, eGain Corporation,

Gunjan Sinha is an Indian-American entrepreneur and business executive. He is the founder and chairman of OpenGrowth Ventures and a co-founder of Project NANDA, an initiative associated with MIT focused on an open “internet of AI agents.”

He is also the founder of WhoWhere?, an internet search engine he sold to Lycos in 1998. He co-founded the customer engagement software provider eGain Corporation. He has served on the board of numerous Silicon Valley startups including Regalix, MetricStream, DesignEverest.

== Early life and education ==
Gunjan Sinha was born and brought up in Bihar, India. He attended the Indian Institutes of Technology where he earned a B.Tech. in Computer Science.

In 1989, he went on to attend the University of California, Santa Cruz where he obtained a M.S. in computer science. He added an M.S. in Industrial Engineering and Engineering Management from Stanford University prior to launching his entrepreneurial career.

== Career ==
Prior to founding numerous companies, Sinha spent time as a hardware developer at Olivetti Advanced Technology Center as well as an industry advisor for inDplay, Inc. One of his first business ventures was Parsec Technology Pvt. Ltd., a company he co-founded in 1994. He launched one of the first internet search engines in 1995. Known as WhoWhere?, he served as the company's president until he sold the company to Lycos in 1998 for $133 million in stock. At the time of the sale, Lycos was the 4th most popular website behind American Online, Yahoo, and MSN.

After WhoWhere?, Sinha went on to co-found eGain Corporation, a provider of customer engagement software. He took the company public on the NASDAQ in 1998 and served as the company's president until 2003 when he joined MetricStream where he still serves as the Executive Chairman. Sinha was on the board of LearnStreet, an online education website for computer programmers. Launched in 2012, the company is backed by Khosla Ventures.

Gunjan Sinha has also been the chairman of OpenGrowth, a venture incubation and holding company helping entrepreneurial teams build lasting companies.

Sinha has served on numerous boards, including for-profit and various non profits. He is the chairman of OpenGrowth.org which is a 501(3)c non-profit corporation based in Palo Alto, California. OpenGrowth.org is one of the stakeholders in The Dynamic Coalition on ‘Internet & Jobs’, under the United Nations - Internet Governance Forum. OpenGrowth.org has numerous social impact initiatives like mPrivacy.org, CFHI.org and AISquare.org. mPrivacy.org is an initiative for all the telcos and mobile operators to come together and support a common standard for ethical data exchange that is both privacy-preserving while being risk-aware. CFHI.org brings transformative healthcare education to under-served communities around the world while AISquare.org is aggregating researchers, research and science communities to solve society's most complex challenges emerging out of COVID-19 pandemic.

He has also served as Chairman of SiliconIndia Inc., Regalix, and previously for arcadiaOne, Inc. He was appointed to the board of the Indo-US Science & Technology Forum and previously served as a trustee for the University of California Santa Cruz Foundation. He is also a frequent speaker at Horasis, an independent think tank organization based in Zurich, Switzerland.

== Recognition ==
In 2007, Sinha was one of 13 Indian Americans to be named to the list of Outstanding 50 Asian Americans in Business. He was also featured as one of the 50 Most Successful Immigrant Entrepreneurs by Silicon India.
