= Lake Yosemite =

Artificial lake in California, United States

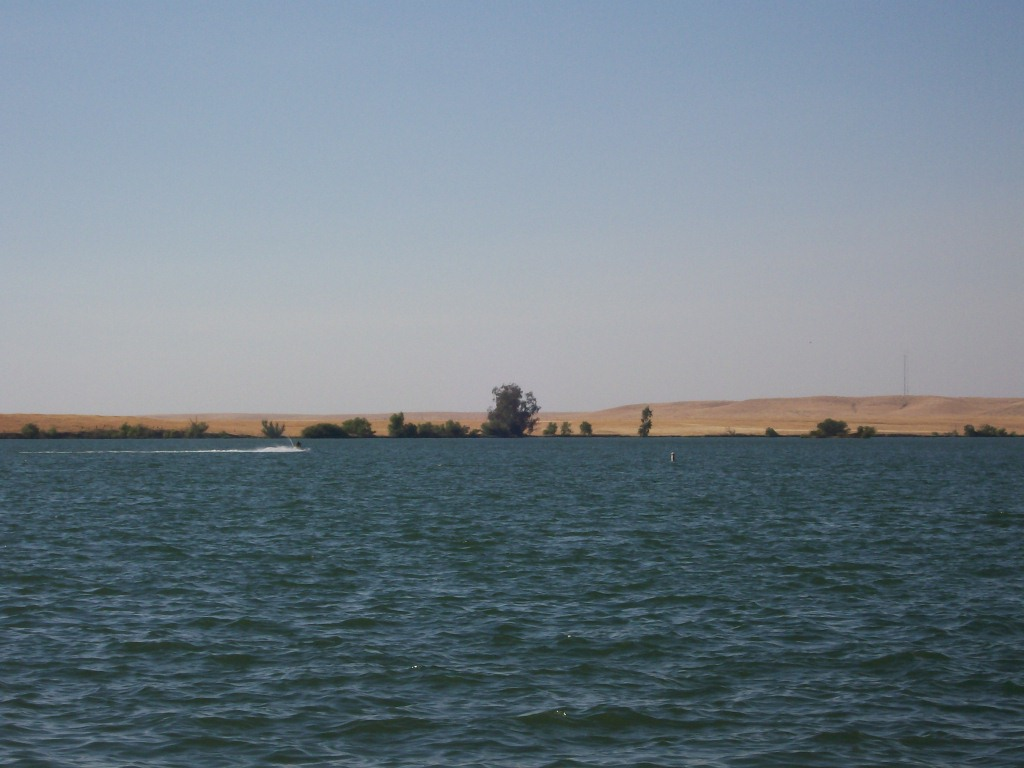

- Location within California Location within the United States
- Location: Merced County, California, United States
- Coordinates: 37°22′35″N 120°25′44″W
- Type: Reservoir
- Primary inflows: Main Canal
- Primary outflows: Fairfield Canal; Le Grand Canal
- Basin countries: United States
- Max. length: 0.899 mi (1.447 km)
- Surface area: 500 acres (200 ha)
- Average depth: 53 ft (16 m)
- Water volume: 7,425 acre⋅ft (9,159,000 m^{3})
- Surface elevation: 253 ft (77 m)

Lake Yosemite is an artificial freshwater lake located approximately 5 mi (8.0 km) east of Merced, California, in the rolling Sierra Foothills. The lake is just 0.5 miles away from UC Merced, and its two outflows canals, Fairfield and Le Grand, run through the campus.

== Operation ==
Lake Yosemite is a reservoir built in 1888 for irrigation purposes. It is currently owned and operated by Merced Irrigation District, which supplies irrigation water to farms in Merced County. Recreation on the lake is managed by the Merced Irrigation District as of February 1st, 2026. Prior, it was overseen by Merced County.

== Irrigation ==
Lake Yosemite's history dates back to the late 1888 as part of William G. Collier's desire to build irrigation infrastructure in Merced. After having moved to Merced County in 1859, he had to relocate from north Merced to south Merced in order to access water for irrigation. At the time, little irrigation infrastructure was in place, so those who needed it had to relocate closer to bodies of water. Following the move, he began to work on his goal of large-scale irrigation in Merced, creating the foundation of what would eventually become the Main Canal used today. In the 1800s, the Main Canal was known as the Robla Canal.

In 1883, C. H. Huffman organized the Merced Canal & Irrigation Company and bought out Collier’s irrigation company. After merging both entities, Huffman widened the canal established by Collier and created a secondary canal to pour into a reservoir, which is now known as Lake Yosemite. Both were completed in 1888 and a large celebration was held to recognize the work completed along with the opportunities created by the new irrigation system.

In 1920, J.D. Galloway of San Francisco established the Merced Irrigation District (MID) and purchased the entire Merced irrigation system. The irrigation side of the lake has since been overseen by the MID.

Lake Yosemite's role in Merced irrigation is reliant on several other bodies of water. The lake is filled by the Main Canal, which carries water from the Merced River's closest access point in Snelling (approximately 17 miles from Merced). The Main Canal not only feeds into Lake Yosemite, but also directs water south to the land that borders Merced. Water is distributed from Lake Yosemite to farmland further downstream via the Fairfield and Le Grand Canals.

== Wildlife ==
Although Lake Yosemite is a man-made reservoir, it has become an important habitat for a diverse range of wildlife, including birds and plants.

Citizen science observations recorded by Merced residents have shown seasonal variations in the bird species found around Lake Yosemite. In the fall and winter months, Mountain Bluebirds (Sialia currucoides) can be spotted across the trees surrounding the lake along with the Red-breasted Sapsucker (Sphyrapicus ruber). During the warmer months, Lesser Nighthawks (Chordeiles acutipennis) are a common sight as well. In the water, Clark’s Grebe (Aechmophorus clarkii) are found paddling year-round.

Just south of the lake is a prominent Eucalyptus grove. It serves as a covered area for people seeking shade and another hotspot for a variety of birds such as the Great Horned Owl (Bubo virginianus) and Bullock's orioles (Icterus bullockiorum).

== Recreation ==
The shores of Lake Yosemite are equipped with boat launches and decks. Boating activities, including jet skis and water skiing, are permitted on site. With no lifeguards working at the lake, swimming is allowed only in designated areas. Swimming outside these areas is strictly prohibited due to boats on the lake and can result in a citation. The lake also has a paddle board and kayak service through the PadYak Shack.

Onshore, shaded picnic areas with picnic tables, barbecue pits, restrooms, and a small playground, are available.

=== Lake Yosemite Sailing Association ===
Lake Yosemite is home to the Lake Yosemite Sailing Association (LYSA), a recreational sailing organization founded in 1988 with more than 90 current members. During the summer, the LYSA hosts weekly sailboat races on Thursday evenings during the summer months. Sailing excursions are also taken to other lakes throughout California. In addition, LYSA offers summer youth sailing camps that introduce younger people to sailing techniques and water safety.

== Photos ==
Lake Yosemite

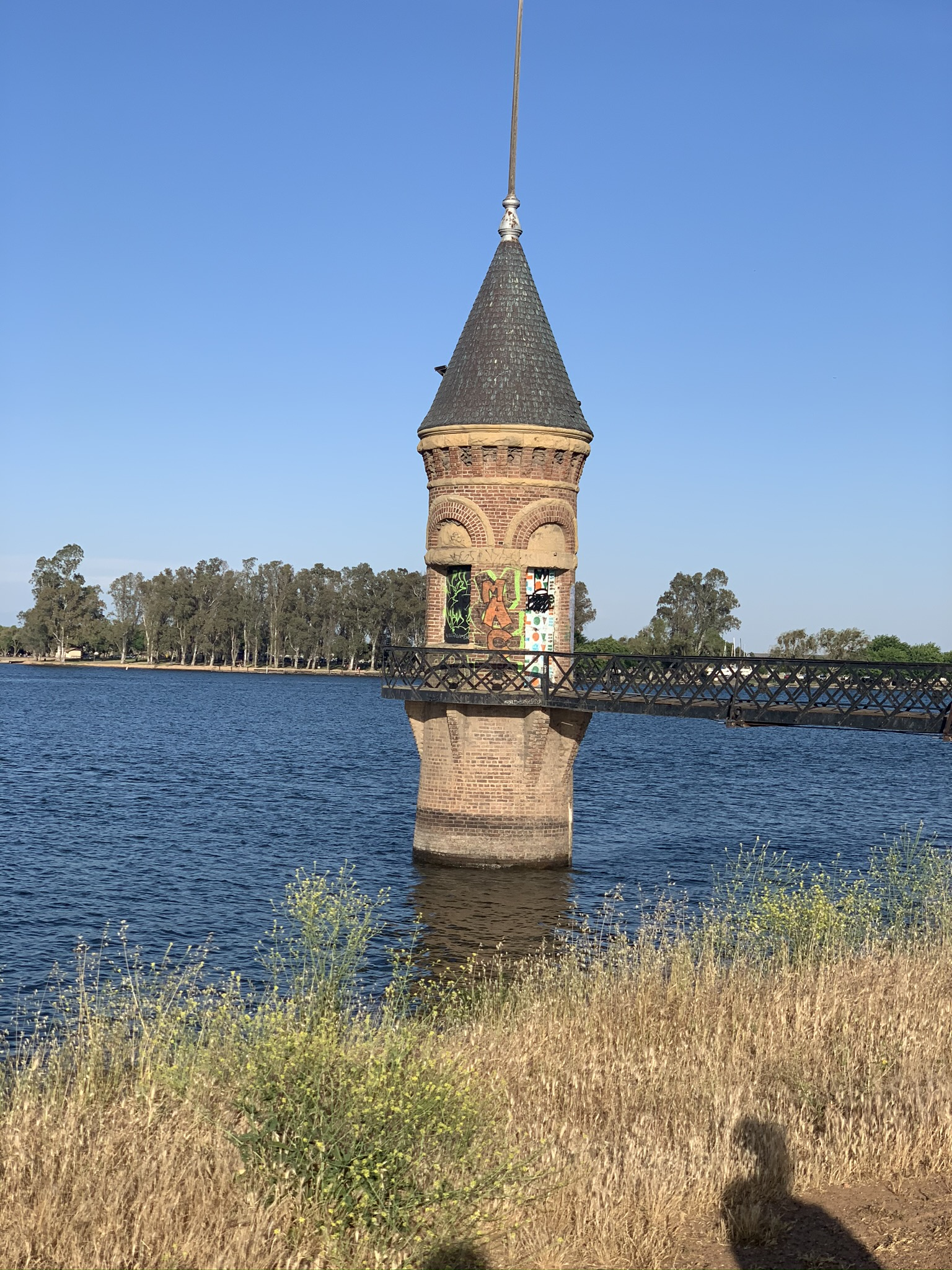
Tower at Lake Yosemite

== See also ==
- Lake McClure
- List of lakes in California
- San Luis Reservoir
