= Carol Tomlinson-Keasey =

American developmental psychologist (1942–2009)

1st Chancellor of the University of California, Merced
- In office 1999–2007
- Succeeded by: Sung-Mo "Steve" Kang

Personal details
- Education: Pennsylvania State University; Iowa State University; University of California, Berkeley

Academic background
- Thesis: The nature of formal operations in pre-adolescence, adolescence, and middle age (1970)

Academic work
- Discipline: Psychology
- Institutions: University of Colorado; University of California, Riverside; University of California, Davis; University of California, Merced

Carol Tomlinson-Keasey (1942–2009) became the first female founding chancellor of a University of California campus when she was named to head the University of California, Merced in 1999. She was a developmental psychologist by training.

== Early life and education ==
Carol Tomlinson was born on October 15, 1942, to a career U.S. Army officer in Washington, D.C. Her family moved many times before she graduated from high school in France. She received her bachelor’s degree in political science from Pennsylvania State University, a master’s in psychology from Iowa State University and her doctorate in developmental psychology from University of California, Berkeley. She also completed postdoctoral studies at the Institute of Behavioral Genetics at the University of Colorado.

== Career ==
Tomlinson-Keasey was a professor at UC Merced's School of Social Sciences, Humanities, and Arts. Her research interests included developmental psychology and development of cognitive potential. As a developmental psychologist, she was the author of three books and dozens of published articles, monographs and book chapters on subjects such as child and full-life development and how gifted children realize their cognitive potential.

=== UC Merced campus ===
As the individual charged with leading the effort to build the Merced-based campus in the San Joaquin Valley, the first new University of California campus in four decades, the hurdles she faced were plentiful, including: political opposition, a state budget crisis, and a site change that reduced the size of the campus because of environmental concerns. She also took charge of helping to develop UC Merced’s academic program and recruiting and hiring key administrators and faculty members. The difficulties combined to cause a 12-month delay in the opening of the campus, but that finally happened in September 2005 with 875 students, and had Tomlinson-Keasey as chancellor.

Before becoming chancellor at the University of California, Merced, Tomlinson-Keasey had been vice provost for academic initiatives for the University of California system. She joined the UC system in 1977 as an associate professor of psychology at University of California, Riverside before moving on to the University of California, Davis. There, she was appointed dean of the College of Letters and Sciences in 1994 and was named vice provost for academic planning and personnel in 1995. In 1997, She moved to the UC Office of the President.

She announced her resignation from the chancellor's office in March 2006 saying, at the time, that she wanted to return to teaching and writing. She continued her academic duties until August 31, 2006 when she was succeeded as chancellor by Steve Kang.

=== Death ===
Tomlinson-Keasey died on October 10, 2009, aged 66, at her home in Decatur, Georgia from complications of breast cancer.
