= University of California, Santa Cruz Silicon Valley Initiatives =

UCSC Silicon Valley Campus
- Type: Public
- Established: 2016
- Location: Silicon Valley, CA, USA
- Campus: Urban
- Website: siliconvalley.ucsc.edu

The UCSC Silicon Valley Initiatives are a series of educational and research activities which together increase the presence of the University of California in Silicon Valley. To that end, UC Santa Cruz has set up a 90,000 square-foot satellite campus called the University of Santa Cruz Silicon Valley Campus (SVC), currently located on Bowers street in Santa Clara, California, where it has been since April 2016 The Initiatives, still in the early stages of their development, have had ambitious hopes attached to them by UCSC, among them the possibility of a home for the University's long-planned graduate school of management and the Bio|Info|Nano R&D Institute. It currently houses professional the SVLink incubator-accelerator program, programs and a distance education site for the UCSC Baskin School of Engineering, the UCSC Silicon Valley Extension, the Office of Industry Alliances and Technology Commercialization leadership, and the University of California's online learning program, UC Scout.

== Graduate programs ==
The Silicon Valley Campus offers several master's programs designed to support the diverse workforce in the Silicon Valley area. It currently houses an M.S. program in Natural Language Processing and M.S. in Human-Computer Interaction.

== Innovation, entrepreneurship, and research ==
Part of the mission of the Silicon Valley Campus is to create a space where academic researchers can connect with global industry leaders, with hopes that these connections will lead to increased innovation and the development of life-enhancing technologies. To this end, the Silicon valley initiatives have sought to create a number of opportunities for UC affiliates to work with industry leaders. Engineering students often intern in the Silicon Valley, and many of the school's alumni have joined or founded companies in the area. UCSC's Silicon Valley Campus also serves as a venue for public talks by faculty and local leaders, like the Kraw Lecture Series on Science and Technology.

=== Cyber-Physical Systems Research Center (CPSRC) ===
This research center studies cyber-physical systems, which rely on computational algorithms integrated with physical components. The goal of the center is to facilitate collaborative research on these large and complicated systems within UCSC and with industrial partners. It studies, among other things, autonomous systems, human sensing, smart cities and buildings, power grids, agriculture, manufacturing, transportation, and connected health.

=== Data, Discovery, and Decisions (D3) Research Center ===
The D3 Research Center opened in 2017 and is led by Professor of Computer Science Lise Getoor. It engages with foundational computational, mathematical, and statistical research to make it easier to make decisions and discoveries based on complex data sets. The goal of the center is to develop open-source tools for addressing the challenges big data presents, and to create a platform for partnering with the industries in the Silicon Valley area in the field of data science.

=== The Center for Research in Open Source Software (CROSS) ===
This center is designed to facilitate the transfer of student research into industry via open-source projects. It was founded after UCSC student Sage Weil successfully founded the distributed storage platform Ceph. Its goal is to create a path for graduate students to become entrepreneurs in the tech industry, drawing on the expertise of Silicon Valley experts.

=== The Genomics Institute ===
The Genomics Institute was established in 2014 to research ways to employ intelligent diagnostics to get cures to people more quickly and to understand the genetic underpinnings of a variety of diseases and conditions. It creates open-source genomics platforms and other technologies to find evolutionary patterns and the genetic underpinnings of disease, and it is committed to openly sharing its innovations to promote a healthier society. The institute has close partnerships with industries in the area, and research at the institute has led to the creation of several new companies, including Five3 Genomics, Maverix Biomics, MagArray, Two Pore Guys, and Dovetail Genomics.

=== Storage Systems Research Center (SSRC) ===
The SSRC focuses on file and storage systems, and particularly on the security and reliability in such systems. It has active projects in archival storage, large-scale distributed storage systems, creating file systems for more advanced storage devices, and managing scalable metadata. The center frequently collaborates with local industry.

== See also ==
- University of California, Santa Cruz
- Jack Baskin School of Engineering
