= United States–India Science and Technology Endowment Fund =

Sci-tech funding body

The United States-India Science & Technology Endowment Fund is a joint fund established between the United States and India for the purpose of promoting innovation through science and technology. It is governed by a board representing both India and the United States and provides grants of up to $500,000 for joint projects between the U.S. and India.

== History ==
The U.S.-India Science & Technology Endowment Fund was established in 2009 with a joint agreement between the United States and India, having an annual budget of approximately $2 to $3 million per year. A board with members from both countries was established to award grants on a semi-annual basis. The board was established through the United States Department of State and the India Department of Science & Technology.

In May 2012, then United States Secretary of State Hillary Clinton and former Indian Minister of Science and Technology Vilasrao Deshmukh awarded the first grantee of the fund. The first grantees included a partnership between both countries to develop a cold chain storage for produce, a procedure for metabolic screening of newborns, and a shoe specifically built to assist patients with Parkinson's disease.

== See also ==
- India–United States relations
