= Nicotine and Cannabis Policy Center =

Research institute

- Abbreviation: NCPC
- Formation: 2018; 8 years ago
- Location: UC Merced
- Director: Arturo Durazo
- Parent organization: University of California
- Website: ncpc.ucmerced.edu

The Nicotine and Cannabis Policy Center (NCPC) is a research institute operated by the University of California, Merced and funded by the Tobacco-Related Disease Research Program and Proposition 56 (2017).

NCPC is directed by Dr. Arturo Durazo. It is housed on the campus of UC Merced. Its goal is addressing nicotine and cannabis policy issues across the 11 counties in San Joaquin Valley and the surrounding Sierra Nevada mountains. The institute was placed at UC Merced due to its proximity to a large, diverse population and higher rates of tobacco and cannabis use compared to the rest of the state.

The center was the first institute in the state of California to test wastewater for evidence of nicotine consumption.
