= Dorothy Leland =

American academic administrator

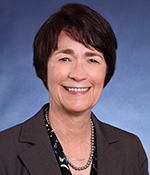
- Leland in 2011

3rd Chancellor of the University of California, Merced
- In office 2011–2019
- Preceded by: Sung-Mo Kang
- Succeeded by: Juan Sánchez Muñoz

19th President of Georgia College & State University
- In office 2004–2011
- Preceded by: David G. Brown
- Succeeded by: Stas Preczewski

Personal details
- Education: Purdue University, B.A., M.A., and PhD
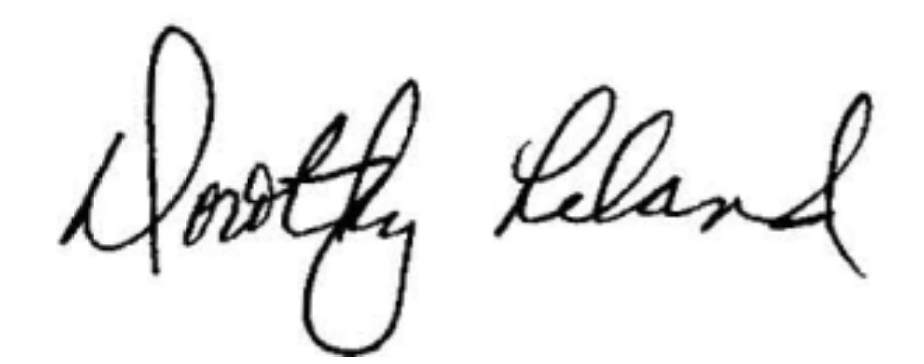
- Signature

Academic background
- Thesis: Consciousness, language, and world: Four essays on contemporary continental thought (1978)
- Doctoral advisor: Calvin Schrag

Academic work
- Discipline: Philosophy
- Institutions: Georgia College & State University; University of California, Merced

Dorothy Leland, also known as Dorothy Leland Wilson, is an American academic administrator, university president and chancellor. She was the 19th president, and the second female president, of Georgia College & State University from 2004 until 2011. Leland was appointed as the third Chancellor for University of California, Merced, replacing Sung-Mo "Steve" Kang from May 18, 2011, until 2019. In 2019, she announced plans to retire.

== Biography ==
Leland holds a B.A degree in English, a M.A. in American studies, and a Ph.D. in philosophy, all from Purdue University. Her research area is contemporary continental philosophy, with a focus on gender and personal, social and cultural identity.

Leland has served on the board of directors of the American Association of State Colleges and Universities, Council for Higher Education Accreditation, the Georgia Chamber of Commerce and other local and state non-profit organization. She was a member of the NCAA Division II Presidents Council and has held leadership positions with the Council of Public Liberal Arts Colleges and the Southern University Conference.

Leland has received numerous awards and honors, including the Georgia Governor's Award for Historic Preservation. In 2008, she was recognized as a Purdue University Distinguished Alumni, and in 2009, she was named by Georgia Trend as one of four "Power Women" in Georgia.
