= EGain =

American technology company

eGain Corporation
- Type: Public
- Traded as: Nasdaq: EGAN; Russell 2000 Component
- Founded: 1997; 29 years ago
- Founder: Ashutosh Roy; Gunjan Sinha
- Headquarters: Sunnyvale, California, United States
- Revenue: ▲$93 million (2024)
- Website: www.egain.com

Headquartered in Sunnyvale, California, eGain Corporation (NASDAQ: EGAN) helps businesses automate customer and employee experience with its AI knowledge software.

== History ==
eGain was founded in September 1997 By Ashutosh Roy and Gunjan Sinha. At the time, they were part of WhoWhere?, an Internet search company they cofounded in 1994. eGain first product, a web-based customer email response management tool was based on their personal experience of dealing with the challenge of efficiently handling thousands of user email requests at WhoWhere?. In 1998, WhoWhere? was sold to Lycos, one of the big four search engines (Excite, Infoseek, Lycos, Yahoo) of the dot com era.

- In April 1999, eGain acquired SiteBridge, a NYC based chat software provider.
- In September 1999, eGain went public on NASDAQ, its stock ticker was EGAN.
- In February 2000, eGain acquired Big Science, an Atlanta based AI chatbot software provider.
- In March 2000, eGain acquired Inference, a pioneering AI technology company based in Novato, CA that built case-based reasoning systems for decision support and customer service.
- In May 2001, eGain acquired Nitman Software, a Pune-based software development company in India.
- In July 2014, eGain acquired Exony, a Newbury, England based provider of operational analytics software provider for call centers.

== Products and services ==
eGain offers a SaaS suite of AI Knowledge products to help businesses automate business operations, improve customer experience, and assist employees.

1. At the core of eGain’s software offering is the eGain AI Knowledge Hub. It sources content from multiple content repositories, including SharePoint, Confluence, SFDC Knowledge and others. This content is transformed into a single sources of truth that is correct, consistent, and compliant, by orchestration of AI and experts. The Hub enables extension and integration via a library of source connectors (migration, synchronization, or federation of content), process connectors (enterprise tool and data connectivity) and experience connectors (for consumption of knowledge in desktops like CcaaS and CRM).
2. eGain AI Agent is an agentic solution that uses trusted, personalized knowledge from the AI Knowledge Hub and other sources to deliver proactive, contextual conversational guidance and answers to customers, employees, and AI systems. AI Agent is available for customer self-service, contact centers, and employees.
3. eGain Composer is a developer-focused offering that includes connectors, SDKs, reference designs, and APIs to help them compose AI Knowledge solutions using modular capabilities from eGain, third-parties, or developed.
4. The company offers a proprietary method, the eGain AI Knowledge Method, to implement its products.
