= University of California, Merced =

Public university in Merced, California, U.S.

- Motto: Fiat lux (Latin)
- Motto in English: Let there be light
- Type: Public land-grant research university
- Established: September 5, 2005; 21 years ago
- Parent institution: University of California
- Accreditation: WSCUC
- Endowment: $32.9 million (2024)
- Budget: $399.4 million (2022–23)
- Chancellor: Juan Sánchez Muñoz
- Provost: Betsy Dumont
- Faculty: 463 (April 2025)
- Administrative staff: 1,330 (April 2025)
- Students: 9,110 (fall 2024)
- Undergraduates: 8,372 (fall 2024)
- Postgraduates: 738 (fall 2024)
- Location: Merced, California, United States; 37°21′58″N 120°25′25″W
- Campus: 1,026 acres (415 ha); Fringe rural Core Campus: 245 acres (99 ha) Total: 8,195 acres (3,316 ha)
- Other campuses: Atwater; Fresno
- Newspaper: The Prodigy
- Colors: Bobcat Blue; Bobcat Gold
- Nickname: Golden Bobcats
- Sporting affiliations: NCAA Division II – CCAA
- Mascot: Rufus the Bobcat
- Website: ucmerced.edu
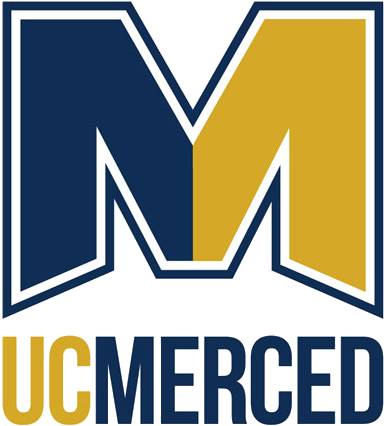

The University of California, Merced (UC Merced or colloquially, UCM) is a public land-grant research university in Merced County, California, United States. Established in 2005, it is the tenth and newest campus of the University of California (UC) system. The main campus is around 810 acres (330 hectares) in size and located around 5 miles (8.0 km) north of the city of Merced and sits adjacent to Lake Yosemite. The campus is adjacent to large swaths of protected natural grasslands and vernal pools, which have shaped its development, capital planning, and research.

UC Merced offers over 60 undergraduate degrees and 18 graduate and professional degrees; it is also organized into three schools: Engineering; Natural Sciences; and Social Sciences, Humanities and Arts. In fall 2024, the university enrolled 8,372 undergraduates and 738 graduate students. In 2025 the university was classified as an R1 Carnegie research institution becoming the only R1 institution in the Central Valley and one of the youngest universities ever to attain the designation.

== History ==
The establishment of the campus followed decades of work including political lobbying, environmental review, and demographic analysis. The process was driven by the increasing population of the region and the state of California as well as the lack of educational access within the San Joaquin Valley.

=== Site selection ===
In the early 1980s, the Regents of the University of California initiated a formal process to identify a location for a new University of California campus. The San Joaquin Valley at the time the largest and most populated area of the state that lacked a UC campus. On May 19, 1988, the UC Regents voted to move forward with a plan to establish a new campus in this region. This decision was largely influenced by mounting enrollment pressures known as "Tidal Wave II" where the children of baby boomers would start to enroll in college increasing demand across the existing campuses. In 1989, the Regents further authorized then UC President David P. Gardner to begin the planning process for up to three new campuses to meet these educational demands. Attention quickly turned toward the San Joaquin Valley, which, despite its size and significance, had yet to be served by a UC institution. Residents of the region who wanted to attend a UC campus had to travel significant distances to coastal cities or the Sacramento area which in turn contributed to lower rates of educational attainment in the region compared to the rest of the state.

A wide range of expert consultant teams comprising biologists, engineers, economists, cultural resource analysts, and academic planners were assembled to analyze the eight Preferred sites. This phase of the review also included major public forums organized by the UC Site Selection Task Force, held in key cities such as Bakersfield, Fresno, and Modesto. Hundreds of stakeholders, including community leaders, local residents, and elected officials, attended these meetings to express their opinions and discuss how the campus would impact their region. By 1992, the field was narrowed once more, this time to three final contenders: Fresno, Madera, and Merced. However, plans for selecting a final site were temporarily stalled due to economic constraints and statewide budget issues, delaying any progress until 1993.

Some state lawmakers expressed skepticism toward the project's feasibility: State Senator John Burton called the proposal the "biggest boondoggle ever." Additional delays occurred when environmental impact assessments for the Madera and Merced sites were found to be inadequate or incomplete, leading to a new round of reviews. Ultimately, on May 19, 1995, the Regents of the University of California made the final decision to locate the new campus in Merced, choosing it over the other two finalist sites in Madera and Fresno.

=== Development ===
After the University of California completed its site selection process, officials at the state, regional, and local levels launched efforts to craft comprehensive planning and conservation strategies necessary to address the various development challenges associated with the UC Merced project. In October 1996, the County of Merced revised its General Plan, formally designating a Specific Urban Development Plan (SUDP) area and outlining a series of long term public planning goals intended to shape development over the coming decades. Among the priorities set forth in this plan were commitments to protecting farmland, conserving natural wetland and other environmental resources, promoting sustainable growth, and ensuring that the UC Merced campus would be constructed in a timely and environmentally conscious manner. In April 1997, the City of Merced expanded its sphere of influence to incorporate the SUDP area and agreed to collaborate closely with Merced County to facilitate the project's advancement.

In February 1998, a formal partnership was established between the University of California, Merced County, the City of Merced, the Virginia Smith Trust, and the Merced Irrigation District. This collaborative team initiated the Concept Planning Phase for the envisioned University Community. As part of this initiative, Merced County adopted a "Guidance Package," which aimed to establish a framework for evaluating and managing university related development to ensure that it remained consistent with the existing General Plan. This planning process culminated with the publication of the University Community Concept Report in May 1999, a foundational document that helped guide future steps. Simultaneously, discussions began between university and county representatives and federal and state permitting agencies to streamline approvals for Section 404 permits and other regulatory clearances. At the time, most early planning efforts were concentrated on the Lake Yosemite area, located adjacent to the proposed campus footprint. The proximity of the lake was seen as a significant asset, both for its aesthetic appeal and its ability to distinguish UC Merced from the other UC campuses.

Progress on the project received a major boost in March 1996 when California voters approved Proposition 203, the Public Education Facilities Bond Act. This bond initiative authorized the allocation of funds for constructing new public education facilities, including those within the UC system. To supplement this, Assemblymember Dennis Cardoza secured an additional $55 million in dedicated state funds for UC Merced, with the explicit intention of ensuring the project would not impact the financial standing of the other nine UC campuses. In 1999, the Regents of the University of California appointed Carol Tomlinson-Keasey as UC Merced's founding chancellor, a key figure who proved instrumental in advocating for continued state support and funding.

To meet environmental standards, a formal wetland delineation following the 1987 U.S. Army Corps of Engineers guidelines was conducted, along with extensive biological surveys throughout 1999 and 2000. These surveys targeted a wide range of species including rare vernal pool invertebrates, plants, amphibians, and mammals to assess potential ecological constraints. Given the sensitivity of these habitats, UC and Merced County launched a detailed evaluation of fifteen alternative sites within eastern Merced County to determine if any offered fewer environmental conflicts while still meeting institutional and community development goals.

These studies led to the creation of the Comprehensive Alternatives Analysis (CAA), which ultimately recommended relocating the main campus site. The new site, situated on the grounds of the former Merced Hills Golf Course, was located approximately three miles south of the original location, but still within Virginia Smith Trust property. In addition, the planned University Community was shifted southward off of highly sensitive environmental lands and closer to established urban areas and infrastructure, bringing the project into greater alignment with the City of Merced's existing development patterns. By early 2001, both the university and Merced County had each prepared their own Environmental Impact Reports (EIRs) for the revised campus and community plans. At the same time, UC pursued federal environmental permits to facilitate future expansion beyond the original golf course site.

The passage of Proposition 203 represented a pivotal moment, marking the first time bond money could be used to construct new buildings in both the UC and California State University systems. In March 2001, the David and Lucile Packard Foundation pledged more than $11 million to help the University of California acquire the full 7,030 acres of land held by the Virginia Smith Trust. This agreement led to the creation of a 5,030-acre protected reserve consisting of critical vernal pool ecosystems, while the remaining 2,000 acres were designated for university use. Of that, 750 acres were immediately set aside for inclusion in the UC Natural Reserve System. The Virginia Smith Trust used the sale proceeds to strengthen its scholarship fund, retire outstanding debt from the Merced Hills Golf Course project, and reinvest in the surrounding community's long-term development goals.

Although the university initially planned to conserve around 5,030 acres (2,040 ha) of vernal pool habitat, this figure was later expanded to approximately 6,428 acres (2,601 ha), resulting in the formal establishment of the Merced Vernal Pools and Grassland Reserve, now part of the broader University of California Natural Reserve System. The site where UC Merced would ultimately rise had originally been developed as a public golf course during the early 1990s. However, when endangered fairy shrimp were discovered at the originally selected site, the project was relocated. Since the golf course land had already been disturbed and was thus exempt from many of the environmental issues, it proved a much more feasible alternative.

UC Merced had opened a small administrative office at Merced College in 1997, and in 1999 constructed a temporary office on the grounds of the decommissioned Castle Airforce Base. In 2001, UC Merced expanded further by opening a satellite center in downtown Bakersfield, California within its University Square area. This site provided outreach and services including college prep courses and counseling for students across Kern County and the broader southern San Joaquin Valley. However, the Bakersfield center was permanently closed in 2011 as part of UC Merced's efforts to manage expenses and balance its operating budget.

=== Recent history ===
The campus groundbreaking ceremony was held October 25, 2002, and the first day of undergraduate classes was September 6, 2005 with 706 freshmen, 132 transfer students, and 37 graduate students. First Lady Michelle Obama gave the commencement address for the university's first full graduating class. The campaign to bring Michelle Obama to campus was started by the students of the graduating class where they wrote over 900 cards asking her to come. The commencement was the First Lady's first commencement speaker event.

With the start of the great recession between 2007 and 2009 the University of California was hit with budget cuts by the state. During this time Andrew Scull and 22 other faculty members from UC San Diego authored a letter calling for UC Merced, UC Riverside, and UC Santa Cruz to be closed as a way to save money. Their reasoning was that these institutions were "in substantial measure teaching institutions". In response to this UC President Mark Yudoff wrote a letter to the leaders of all ten campuses to assure them that there would be no campus closures.

The logo for the University of California, Merced prior to 2022

In 2010, the new student housing facilities, The Summits, opened to provide two additional residential halls for incoming students. The two four-story buildings, Tenaya Hall and Cathedral Hall, are reserved primarily for incoming freshmen students. Three years later, another housing facility, Half Dome, was built next to the existing Tenaya and Cathedral Halls. Half Dome houses both freshman and continuing students.

In 2010, the United States Census Bureau made UC Merced its own separate census-designated place. The university is a census-designated place (CDP) that is uninhabited as of both the 2010 and 2020 census. In addition to lacking population the university covers all of its land in this census-designated place.

In January 2015, UC Merced was nationally classified with the Carnegie Classification for community engagement, along with UC Davis and UCLA. Later that year the University of California started the push to expand the campus capacity to 10,000 students and double its square footage as part of Project 2020. The expansion would be the largest growth in both buildings and students on campus to date, and includes dorms, offices, classrooms and recreation areas.

On November 4, 2015, 18-year-old student Faisal Mohammad stabbed and injured four people with a hunting knife before being shot to death by a campus police officer.

In November 2015, the Regents of the University of California approved a $1.14 billion proposal, known as the 2020 Plan, to double the capacity of UC Merced, boosting its enrollment by nearly 4,000 students. The new buildings were completed in early 2021. In April 2019, the school's student government, the Associated Students of UC Merced, cut off funding for UC Merced's only student-run newspaper, The Prodigy.

UC Merced claims to be the only institution in the United States all of whose buildings have been LEED certified. Its Triple Net Zero Commitment is expected to create zero net landfill waste and zero net greenhouse gas emissions by the year 2020.

UC Merced announced a partnership with UCSF and UCSF Fresno to create a new medical school program by the year 2026, with support from governor Gavin Newsom. The SJV Prime Program which opened its doors in 2011, is part of the upcoming UC Merced School of Medicine. It is specifically focused on preparing and training students to become future doctors who will serve the underserved communities in the Central Valley of California. The SJV Prime program at UC Merced is a unique initiative designed to address the healthcare needs of the area, a region in California that faces significant health disparities due to its socio-economic challenges, high levels of poverty, and a shortage of healthcare professionals. UC Merced's School of Medicine also collaborates with UC San Francisco medical schools, which strengthens educational opportunities available to SJV Prime students and connects them to broader networks of medical professionals. It is an innovative medical education pathway that allows students to complete four years of an undergraduate degree followed by four years of medical school, with a focus on producing healthcare providers who are committed to serving the underserved communities of the San Joaquin Valley.

In early February in 2025, UC Merced earned R1 status from the Carnegie Classification of Institutions of Higher Education. With the designation UC Merced became the only R1 university in the Central Valley. It was announced by the American Council on Education and came less than twenty years after UC Merced opened in 2005, making it one of the youngest institutes to ever attain the classification.

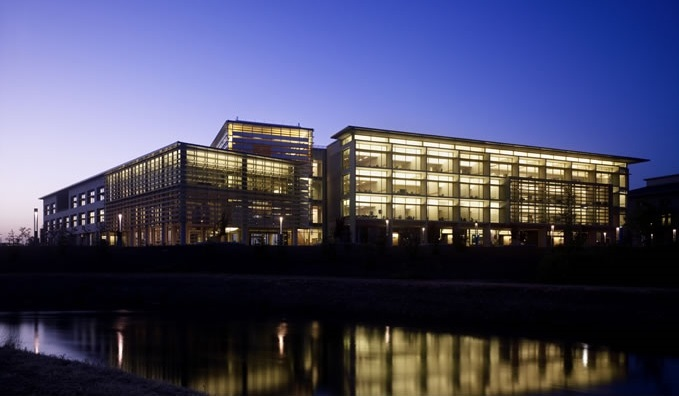
Kolligian Library, one of the first buildings built on campus

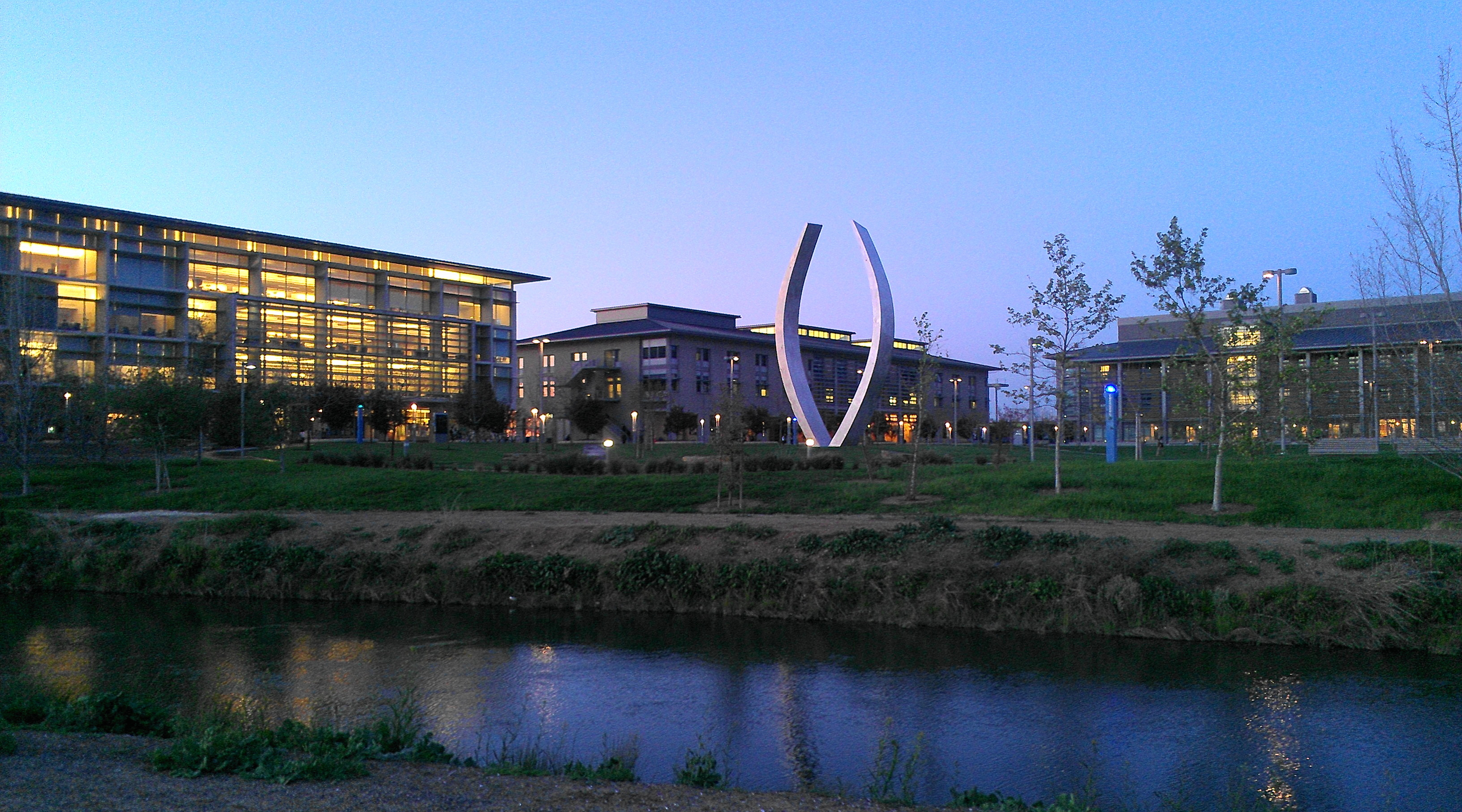
The New Beginnings sculpture

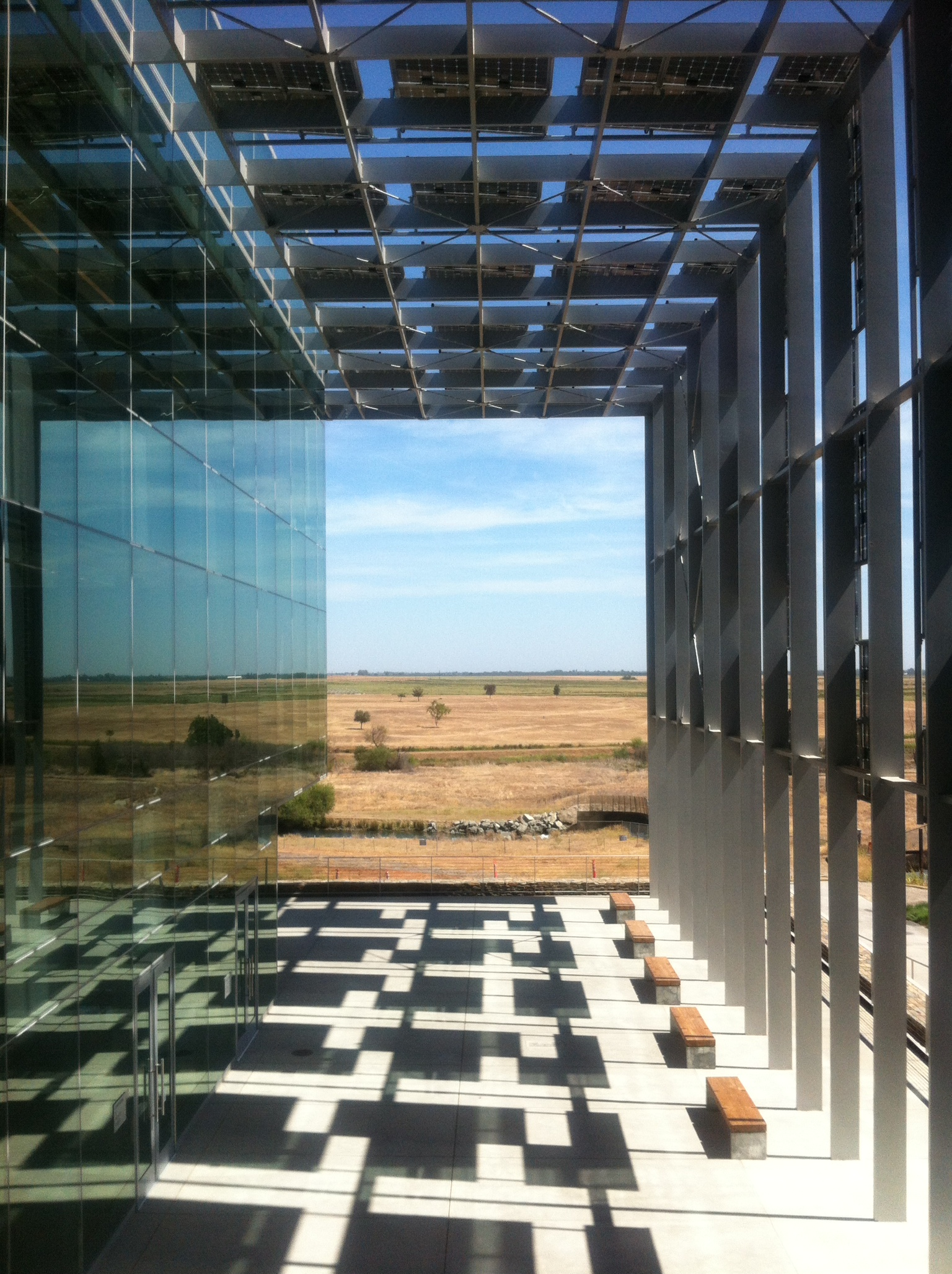
Solar archway at Science and Engineering Building 2

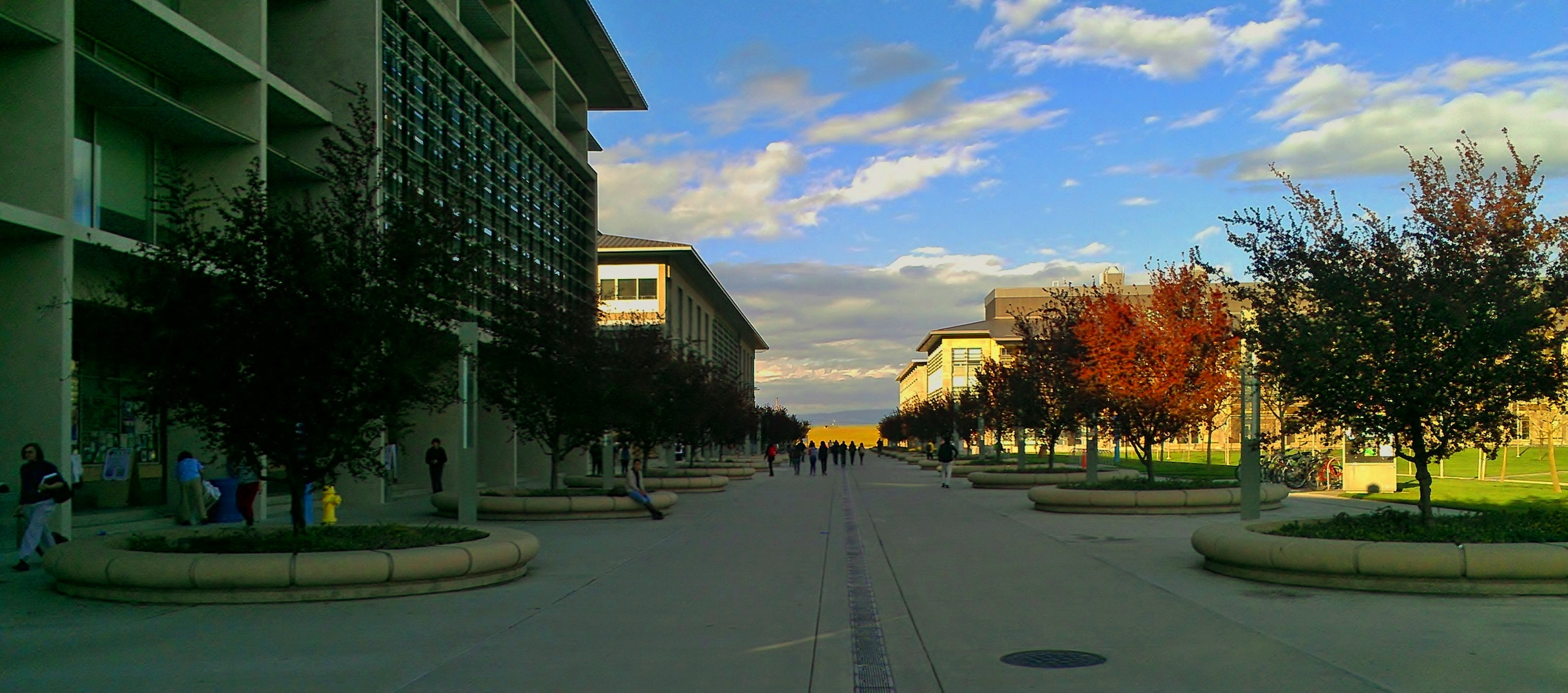
Scholars Lane

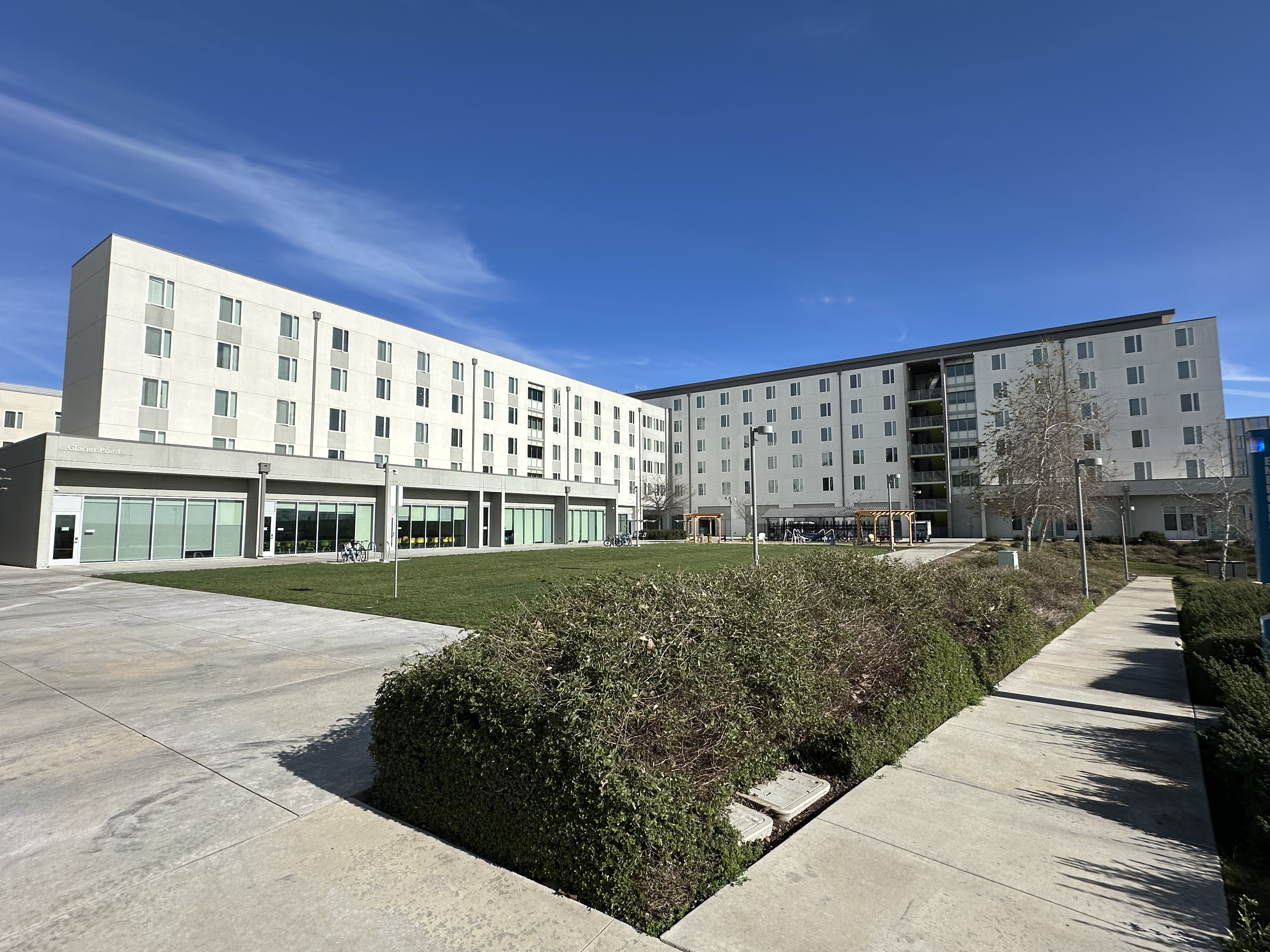
Glacier Point Dorm

== Organization and administration ==
=== Governance ===
Being one of the ten general campuses of the University of California system, UC Merced is governed by a 26-member Board of Regents consisting of 18 officials appointed by the Governor of California, seven ex officio members, and a single student regent. The current president of the University of California is James Milliken, and the administrative head of UC Merced is Juan Sánchez Muñoz. Academic policies are set by each of the school's Academic Senate, and a legislative body including all university faculty members. Nine vice chancellors manage academic affairs, research, diversity, marine sciences, student affairs, planning, external relations, business affairs, and health sciences and report directly to the chancellor.

Carol Tomlinson-Keasey was the first chancellor of the university and held the position from 1999 until she resigned on August 31, 2006. On September 21, 2006, the Regents named Roderic B. Park, a former interim chancellor at the University of Colorado at Boulder, as the acting chancellor for UC Merced. Park remained acting chancellor until Sung-Mo (Steve) Kang, Dean of the Baskin School of Engineering at UC Santa Cruz, took office in early March 2007. Kang held the position until 2011.

After a nationwide search, on May 24, 2011, the Regents of the University of California named Dorothy Leland, then president of Georgia College & State University, to be the university's newest chancellor. On May 13, 2019, Leland announced that she would be stepping down from her position, effective August 15, 2019. UC Executive Vice President and Chief Financial Officer Nathan Brostrom served as interim chancellor until July 2020. In July 2020, Juan Sánchez Muñoz, then president of University of Houston-Downtown, was appointed to the position of Chancellor.

=== Funding ===
UC Merced gets funding from a variety of federal, state, and private sources. With the exception of some government contracts, public support is apportioned to UC Merced and the other campuses of the University of California system through the UC Office of the President and accounts for a large percentage of the university's total revenues.

== Academics ==
Top 10 foreign countries in headcount (Fall 2025)
Country	Headcount
China	102
India	48
Iran	30
Nigeria	22
Bangladesh	21
South Korea	13
Taiwan	11
Colombia	9
Brazil	8
Pakistan	7

UC Merced has three schools offering 27 undergraduate majors and 25 minors:

- School of Engineering
- School of Natural Sciences
- School of Social Sciences, Humanities and Arts

In 2011, the campus was granted accreditation by WASC. In 2014, the School of Engineering received an ABET accreditation for the Mechanical Engineering, Environmental Engineering, and Materials Science and Engineering programs.

The university is also home to the CCBM Summer Internship Program, an undergraduate research fellowship for non-UC Merced students sponsored by the NSF CREST Center for Cellular and Biomolecular Machines. The campus takes advantage of the surrounding environment by investigating issues relating to environmental systems of the Central Valley and Sierra Nevada, and of its youth by having programs in genetic research conducted in state-of-the-art research labs. It also benefits from proximity to Silicon Valley and other major universities. Research in fields like language acquisition and cultural issues is facilitated by the highly diverse ethnic makeup of the Central Valley. UC Merced operates on a semester system rather than the quarter system for its academic term. The Berkeley campus is the only other UC campus on a semester system.

Exclusive to UC Merced, The San Joaquin Valley (SJV) PRIME+ program, is an academic program that combines four years of undergraduate work with four years of medical school. The program offers students a diverse range of academic majors, also offered to the other students at the university, designed to prepare them for healthcare and medical sciences. Students in the undergraduate portion of their education can choose from specialized tracks that align with their academic interests and career goals that include four main areas: biological sciences, bioengineering, chemistry, or public health. The medical school portion emphasizes not only advanced medical knowledge but also the development of skills necessary for providing care in underserved and rural communities, particularly in the central valley. These courses address the unique healthcare needs of the Central Valley's residents, including agricultural workers, immigrant populations, and low-income families. Students in the program study the challenges faced by rural healthcare providers, such as workforce shortages, limited healthcare access, and the higher prevalence of certain diseases in agricultural communities as well as preventative care for these issues.

=== Rankings ===
Academic rankings

National
- Forbes: 173
- U.S. News & World Report: 69 (tie)
- Washington Monthly: 72
- WSJ/College Pulse: 59

Global
- ARWU: 501–600
- THE: 401–500
- U.S. News & World Report: 698 (tie)

UC Merced was ranked 69th (tie) in the 2027 U.S. News & World Report rankings of "Best National Universities" (out of a total of 436 national universities included in the rankings). In the same 2027 rankings, UC Merced was also ranked 30th (tie) in the category of "Top Public Schools", ranked 4th (tie) in "Top Performers on Social Mobility", ranked 149th in "Best Value Schools", and ranked 128th (tie) in "Best Undergraduate Engineering Programs" at schools whose highest degree is a doctorate.

== Admissions and enrollment ==
Undergraduate admission statistics
	Fall 2025	Fall 2024	Fall 2023	Fall 2022	Fall 2021
First-time Freshmen
Applicants	49,366	31,928	30,232	29,920	27,793
Admits	46,565	28,906	26,598	26,766	24,069
Admit rate	94%	91%	88%	89%	87%
Enrolled	1,982	2,093	2,416	2,392	2,410
Yield rate	4%	7%	9%	9%	10%
Transfers
Applicants	5,182	3,786	4,046	4,226	4,962
Admits	3,715	2,397	2,645	2,688	3,056
Admit rate	72%	63%	65%	64%	62%
Enrolled	274	222	209	213	268
Yield rate	7%	9%	8%	8%	9%

UC Merced received 25,368 undergraduate applications for admission for the Fall 2019 incoming freshman class; 18,263 were admitted (72.0%).

Undergraduate enrollment in Fall 2019 was 51.7% women, 47.5% men and 0.8% unknown; approximately 99% were from California.

In 2021 UC Merced received a record-breaking number of applications totaling 30,105 freshman and transfer applications.

The graduate school application pool in 2022 consisted of 40% women and 23% minority students.

== Research institutes ==
- Health Sciences Research Institute (HSRI)
- Sierra Nevada Research Institute (SNRI)
- University of California Advanced Solar Technologies Institute (UC Solar)
- NSF CREST Center for Cellular and Biomolecular Machines (CCBM)
- Merced nAnomaterials Center for Energy and Sensing (MACES)
- Nicotine and Cannabis Policy Center (NCPC)

In 2007, UC Merced researchers obtained nearly $7 million in funding from the National Science Foundation. Grant funding for research has reached over $168.9 million in 2013.

== Campus ==
The campus is in an unincorporated area of Merced County, not in the Merced city limits. A portion of the campus forms a census-designated place.

The campus is bounded by Lake Yosemite on one side. Two irrigation canals run through the campus. The campus master plan was developed by Skidmore, Owings & Merrill, its initial infrastructure by Arup, and its first buildings were designed by Skidmore, Owings & Merrill, Thomas Hacker and Associates, and EHDD Architecture. The library and central power plant have been classified as Leadership in Energy and Environmental Design Gold structures in terms of their high energy efficiency and low environmental impact. The campus is located about seven miles (11 km) north of downtown Merced in the middle of a cattle ranch.

Rather than build on 40 acres (16 ha) of protected land east of Lake Yosemite, where endangered fairy shrimp hatch in vernal pools, the school has built on a 230-acre (93 ha) parcel of grazing land south of campus, under a revised layout. The revised plan covers a total of 810 acres (330 ha) rather than the original 910 acres (370 ha) proposed in 2000. The new design was expected to impact a total of 81 acres (33 ha) of native wetlands in the region compared to the 121 acres (49 ha) forecast in the 2000 footprint.

The Science and Engineering Building 2 opened in 2014. The Classroom and Office Building 2 opened in 2016.

=== Kolligian Library ===
The library was the first building to open on campus. During the Fall 2005 semester, while construction of other buildings was still underway, all academic courses were conducted in the library. Its official motto is "Not what other research libraries are, what they will be."

The library contains more electronic holdings than print holdings, consisting of about 70,000 online journals and 3.965 million electronic books (including 3.15 million HathiTrust full-text books), compared to 102,000 print books. It provides access to 937 databases.

Kolligian is a green library and has received LEED Gold certification.

== Dormitories ==
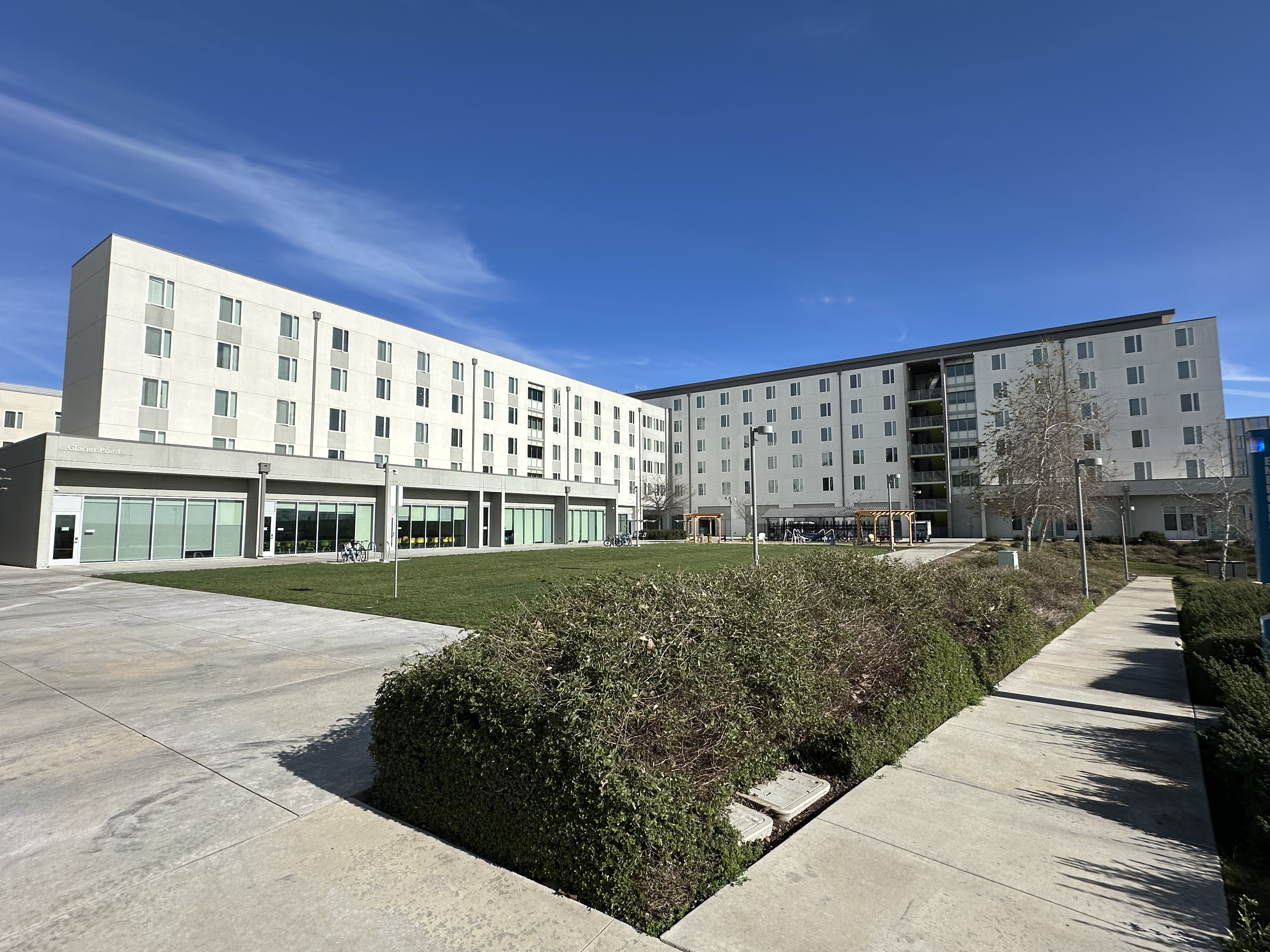
Glacier Point residence hall

ON-campus housing is in two areas. In the south part of campus it includes Granite Pass, Glacier Point, Sentinel Rock, and El Portal, and North Campus includes Half Dome, Tenaya, Cathedral, Mariposa, Tuolumne, and the Valley Terraces. The university offers living-learning communities that group residents with similar interests.

== Athletics ==
The UC Merced athletic teams are called the Golden Bobcats. The university is a member of the National Association of Intercollegiate Athletics (NAIA), primarily competing in the California Pacific Conference (Cal Pac) since the 2011–12 academic year.

UC Merced competes in nine intercollegiate varsity sports: Men's sports include basketball, cross country, soccer and volleyball; while women's sports include basketball, cross country, soccer, volleyball and water polo.

=== Facilities ===
In 2006, the university opened its gymnasium. The Joseph Edward Gallo Recreation and Wellness Center features an "NCAA-sized basketball court, workout facilities, room for performances, wellness and fitness education and the Rajender Reddy Student Health Center".

== Student life ==
Undergraduate demographics as of Fall 2023
Race and ethnicity	Total
Hispanic	58%
Asian	22%
White	9%
Black	5%
Two or more races	4%
Unknown	1%
Economic diversity
Low-income (Note: The percentage of students who received an income-based federal Pell grant intended for low-income students.)	60%
Affluent (Note: The percentage of students who are a part of the American middle class at the bare minimum.)	40%

Approximately 2,100 students currently live on campus in the Valley and Sierra Terraces and the Summits, which includes Tenaya and Cathedral Halls, 4.2 miles (6.8 km) away from the city of Merced. The most recent addition is Half Dome Hall which completed the UC Merced's first residential square. Many students choose to live in new housing subdivisions off campus.

Student publications include the newspaper The Prodigy, Bobcat Radio, The Undergraduate Research Journal, The Undergraduate Historical Journal, and literary journals The Kumquat and Imagination Dead Imagine. The Vernal Pool is a student publication for writing and visual art.

=== CatTracks public transportation system ===
The university operates its own public transportation system, CatTracks. The system has several routes serving off-campus housing developments and locations in central Merced, about 6.5 miles (10.5 km) from campus.

=== Student government ===
Associated Students of the University of California Merced (ASUCM) is the student government that represents the undergraduate students on campus. ASUCM funds student clubs and organizations including a campus visit from Karl Rove in 2010. The organization's Campus Activities Board brings outside talent to campus including comedians and musical acts.

== Alumni ==
The UC Merced Alumni Association (UCMAA) consists of more than 23,000 living members.

As stated by the LA Times in 2016, "Although most UC Merced alumni are still in their 20s, 11% of them contributed to their alma mater — outstripping the giving rate of all other UC campuses except UC Santa Barbara (16%) and UC Berkeley (12%). UCLA's rate was 8%, and UC Riverside, the most comparable campus, was 4%."
