= California Institute for Quantitative Biosciences =

US technological institute

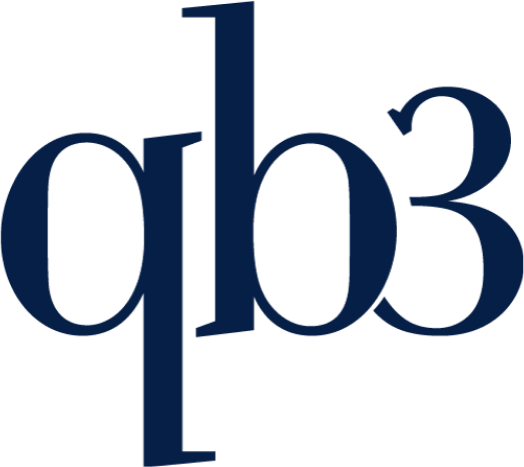
- Formation: December 15, 2000; 25 years ago
- Type: Governor Gray Davis Institute for Science and Innovation
- Headquarters: UCSF Mission Bay campus
- Location(s): University of California, Berkeley; University of California, San Francisco; University of California, Santa Cruz
- Region served: San Francisco Bay Area
- Members: Over 250 faculty
- Parent organization: University of California
- Budget: $5 million
- Staff: Approximately 30
- Website: https://qb3.org

The California Institute for Quantitative Biosciences (QB3) is a nonprofit research and technology commercialization institute affiliated with three University of California campuses in the San Francisco Bay Area: Berkeley, San Francisco, and Santa Cruz. QB3's domain is the quantitative biosciences: areas of biology in which advances are chiefly made by scientists applying techniques from physics, chemistry, engineering, and computer science.

== History ==
QB3 was founded in 2000 as one of four Governor Gray Davis Institutes for Science and Innovation (originally, California Institutes for Science and Innovation, or Cal ISIs). From a 2005 article written for the University of California Academic Senate:

The Institutes were launched in 2000 as an ambitious statewide initiative to support research in fields that were recognized as critical to the economic growth of the state—biomedicine, bioengineering, nanosystems, telecommunications and information technology. Moreover, the Cal ISIs were conceived as a catalytic partnership between university research interests and private industry that could expand the state economy into new industries and markets and "speed the movement of innovation from the laboratory into peoples' daily lives" (Governor's Budget summary 2001-02). The four research centers operate as a partnership among the University, state government, and industry, and each involves structured collaborations among campuses, disciplines, academics researchers, research professional, and students.

== Campus sites ==
The tri-campus organization includes three research branches: QB3-Berkeley, QB3-Santa Cruz, and the Quantitative Biosciences Institute (QBI-UCSF) at the San Francisco campus.

- QB3-Berkeley: The Berkeley branch of QB3 is housed in Stanley Hall along with the Department of Bioengineering, but core research facilities are situated throughout campus, including the Vincent J. Coates Genomics Sequencing Lab at Weill Hall. The Bakar BioEngineering Hub at Woo Hon Fai Hall houses Bakar Labs, a core incubator of QB3.
- QB3-Santa Cruz: At the Santa Cruz campus, QB3 forms part of the Genomics Institute and is headquartered in the Westside Research Park. The space was formerly owned by Texas Instruments as a semiconductor wafer fabrication plant. The facilities include a total of approximately 242,000 gross (154,000 net) square feet, including a large "clean room," a specially designed supercomputer center, and extensive space used for classrooms, laboratories, and offices.
- QBI-UCSF: QBI is situated in Byers Hall on the Mission Bay campus. Byers Hall, officially opened in 2005, also hosts the QB3 director's office and QB3 central administration. Many faculty labs are in Genentech Hall, an adjoining building.

== Leadership ==
QB3 is directed by David Schaffer, a Berkeley professor with appointments in multiple departments who also directs the Bakar BioEnginuity Hub and its associated incubator, Bakar Labs. Each participating campus has a QB3 director who also is an active research scientist: Sanjay Kumar at Berkeley, Nevan Krogan at UCSF, and Ed Green at UC Santa Cruz.

== Faculty affiliates ==
Research faculty affiliates are the foundation of QB3. QB3 has more than 250 faculty affiliates, roughly 100 each from Berkeley, UCSF, and UC Santa Cruz. The research interests of these faculty fall under the umbrella of the quantitative biosciences. QB3 scientists tend to be bioengineers, biophysicists, or pharmaceutical or computational biologists. Synthetic biology is strongly represented. Current and former members of QB3 include Shuvo Roy, Elizabeth Blackburn, Steven Chu, Joseph DeRisi, Jennifer Doudna, David Haussler, Jay Keasling, Arun Majumdar, Harry Noller.

=== Research ===
QB3 member scientists choose affiliations with one of nine research themes:

- Biological imaging – visualizing biological systems at all scales: atoms, cells, organs
- Biomaterials and stem cells – Development of biomaterials and stem cells for biotechnology and therapeutic applications
- Biomolecular structure and mechanism – structure, function and dynamics of macromolecules
- Cellular dynamics – biochemical and biophysical analysis of cellular processes; visualizing biological systems at all scales: atoms, cells, organs
- Chemical biology – applying the tools of chemistry to biology, aiding in drug discovery and interrogation of biology
- Genotype to phenotype – harvesting the information in genomes and the effect of variation
- Precision measurement and control of biological systems – developing the ability to mechanically, optically or chemically alter and monitor biology for interrogation and diagnostics
- Synthetic biology – design, redesign and construction of new biological parts, devices, and systems
- Theoretical modeling of biological systems – theoretical and computational analysis of macromolecules, biological systems, and interpretation of experimental data

== Activities ==
A major function of QB3 is to make connections between scientists in different disciplines and between entrepreneurial scientists and business mentors and venture capitalists. QB3 administers buildings custom-designed to facilitate interaction and core facilities intended to bring together researchers from different fields. QB3 also provides networking services for applied research and technology commercialization. QB3 is not a technology transfer office and does not handle patent applications.

=== Startups ===
QB3 assists life science entrepreneurs seeking to commercialize their research. In UC Berkeley, QB3 operates one full-service incubator, Bakar Labs, which is situated in the Bakar BioEnginuity Hub at Woo Han Fai Hall, and the smaller QB3 Garage@Berkeley space at Stanley Hall.

In Westside Santa Cruz, the UC Santa Cruz-affiliated Startup Sandbox is a biotech incubator that helps entrepreneurs crystalize and innovate ideas into commercially successful businesses. The Sandbox provides an entrepreneurial environment where early-stage startups gain access to low-cost laboratory, office and shared space, resources, training, and networking opportunities.

Previously, QB3 was closely involved in launching and operating incubators, including:

- The QB3 Garage@UCSF, founded in September 2006. (now closed)
- The QB3 East Bay Innovation Center, which launched in June 2011 in West Berkeley. (now closed)
- MBC Biolabs, originally QB3@953 at its address of 953 Indiana St. in San Francisco, which was opened in October 2013. Subsequently the incubator spun off as a private business and rebranded as MBC Biolabs, now expanded to a second location in San Carlos.
- StartX-QB3 Labs, located near Stanford University and Stanford University Medical Center in Palo Alto. (no longer affiliated)

=== Education ===
QB3 is involved in a number of educational initiatives.

- Graduate Training Program in Biomedical Sciences and Engineering (PBSE): QB3 is affiliated with PBSE at UC Santa Cruz, an interdisciplinary Ph.D. program that trains students in biomedical research across five focus areas, including molecular biology, neuroscience, and bioinformatics.
- QB3‑UC Santa Cruz Graduate Innovators Fellowship - Offers GSR support to three UCSC graduate students focusing on biotech/genomics research with translational or entrepreneurial potential.
- UC Berkeley Biophysics: In 2012 QB3 became administrators of the biophysics graduate (PhD) program at UC Berkeley.
- Graduate Program in Computational and Genomic Biology: QB3 is affiliated with the doctoral program in computational and genomic biology at UC Berkeley.
- Synthetic Biology Engineering Research Center (SynBERC): Sends a team to the annual International Genetically Engineered Machine (iGEM) competition. Administrated by QB3.
- Undergraduate Internships:
  - QB3-Berkeley coordinates undergraduate summer internships with biotechnology companies in the Bay Area.
  - QB3-UC Santa Cruz partners with local biotech companies and on-campus labs to offer hands-on summer internships to undergraduates who hold 10-week paid internship positions.

QB3 does not offer accredited courses, nor does it hire faculty.
