= Stringham =

Stringham is a surname. Notable people with the surname include:

- Edward Stringham (born 1975), American professor and writer
- Edwin Stringham (1890–1974), American composer
- Frank D. Stringham (1872–1931), American politician
- Irving Stringham (1847–1909), American mathematician
- Silas Stringham (1798–1876), American naval officer

== Other ==
- USS Stringham, more than one United States Navy ship
