= 1969 People's Park protest =

Protests in 20th century Berkeley, California

- The green area represents People's Park and the brown patterned area represents University of California, Berkeley property.
- Date: May 15, 1969
- Location: Berkeley, California; 37°51′56″N 122°15′25″W

Parties
Protestors	California Highway Patrol; Berkeley police officers; California National Guard

Lead figures
	Ronald Reagan (Governor); Frank Madigan (Sheriff); Wallace J. S. Johnson (Mayor)

Number
3,000–6,000 people	729 police officers 2,700 California National Guard troops

Casualties and losses
1 death 45–128 hospitalized	19–111 police officers injured

The 1969 People's Park protest, also known as Bloody Thursday, took place at People's Park on May 15, 1969. The Berkeley Police Department and other officers clashed with protestors over the site of the park, using deadly force. Ronald Reagan, then-governor of California, eventually sent in the state National Guard to quell the protests.

== Background ==
The 1969 confrontation in People's Park grew out of the counterculture of the 1960s. Berkeley had been the site of the first large-scale antiwar demonstration in the country on September 30, 1964. The late 1960s saw student protests across the United States, such as the 1968 Columbia University and Democratic National Convention protests. On April 3, 1969, students at Stanford University protested war-related research by occupying Encina Hall.

California governor Ronald Reagan had been publicly critical of university administrators for tolerating student demonstrations at the University of California, Berkeley. He had received popular support for his 1966 gubernatorial campaign promise to ramp up pressure on administrators of California's public universities to quell campus protests.

In the U.S. House of Representatives, the Higher Education Protection and Freedom of Expression Act of 1969 was introduced in response to mass protests and demonstrations at universities and colleges across the nation. The bill would have required colleges and universities to file plans of action for dealing with campus unrest with the U.S. commissioner of education, and would have given the institutions the power to suspend federal aid to students convicted, in court or by the university, of violating campus rules in connection with student riots. The bill also proposed that any school that did not file such plans would lose federal funding. Reagan supported the federal legislation; in a March 19 statement, he urged the U.S. Congress to "be equally concerned about those who commit violence who are not receiving aid". On May 20, U.S. attorney general John N. Mitchell advised the committee that existing law was "adequate".

On April 13, 1969, local merchants and residents decided to develop a vacant, unused lot owned by the Berkeley campus into a public park, a "Power to the People Park". Construction started on April 20 and continued for weeks. However, on April 28, Berkeley vice chancellor Earl Cheit announced that the university planned to build a soccer field on the site, though he promised he would notify park supporters before construction. On May 13, Berkeley chancellor Roger Heyns announced that the university would soon erect a fence around the park to begin construction.

== Protest ==
In the early morning of Thursday, May 15, 1969, local police cleared the park, arresting three people who refused to leave. University work crews arrived later, destroyed many of the changes that had been made to the park, and erected an 8-foot (2.4-metre)-tall perimeter chain-link wire fence around the site. The action came at the request of Berkeley mayor Wallace J. S. Johnson. It became the impetus for the "most violent confrontation in the university's history".

Beginning at noon, about 3,000 people appeared in Sproul Plaza at the nearby Berkeley campus for a rally, the original purpose of which was to discuss the Arab–Israeli conflict. Several people spoke; then, Michael Lerner ceded the Free Speech platform to Daniel Mark Siegel, the student body president of Associated Students of the University of California, because students were concerned about the fencing-off and destruction of the park. Siegel said later that he never intended to precipitate a riot; however, when he shouted "Let's take the park!," police turned off the sound system. The crowd responded spontaneously, moving down Telegraph Avenue toward People's Park chanting, "We want the park!" Arriving in the early afternoon, protesters were met by the remaining 159 Berkeley and university police officers assigned to guard the fenced-off park site. The protesters opened a fire hydrant, several hundred protesters attempted to tear down the fence and threw bottles, rocks, and bricks at the officers, and then the officers fired tear gas canisters. A major confrontation ensued between police and the crowd, which had grown to 4,000. Initial attempts by the police to disperse the protesters were not successful, and more officers were called in from surrounding cities. At least one car was set on fire. A large group of protesters confronted a small group of sheriff's deputies who turned and ran. The crowd of protesters let out a cheer and briefly chased after them until the sheriff's deputies ran into a used car facility. The crowd then turned around and ran back to a patrol car which they overturned and set on fire.

=== Shooting ===
The crowds had swelled to approximately 6,000 people. Officers in full riot gear obscured their badges to avoid being identified and headed toward the crowds. As the protesters retreated, the Alameda County Sheriff's deputies pursued them several blocks down Telegraph Avenue as far as Willard Junior High School at Derby Street, firing tear gas canisters and buckshot at the crowd's backs as they fled. Authorities initially claimed that only birdshot had been used as shotgun ammunition. When physicians provided pellets removed from the wounded as evidence that buckshot had been used, Alameda County sheriff Frank Madigan justified the use of shotguns loaded with lethal buckshot by stating, "The choice was essentially this: to use shotguns—because we didn't have the available manpower—or retreat and abandon the City of Berkeley to the mob." Madigan also stated that some of his deputies, many of whom were Vietnam War veterans, had been overly aggressive in their pursuit of the protesters, acting "as though they were Viet Cong".

=== Casualties ===
Alameda County sheriff deputies also used shotguns to fire at people sitting on the roof at the Telegraph Repertory Cinema. James Rector was visiting friends in Berkeley and watching from the roof of Granma Books when he was shot by police; he died on May 19. The Alamada County Coroner's report listed cause of death as "shock and hemorrhage due to multiple shotgun wounds and perforation of the aorta". Reagan conceded that Rector was probably shot by police but justified the bearing of firearms, saying, "I think it is being very naive to assume that you should send anyone into that kind of conflict with a fly swatter. He's got to have an appropriate weapon." According to the University of California Police Department (UCPD), Rector threw steel rebar down onto the police; conversely, according to Time magazine Rector was a bystander, not a protester, and 12 of the sheriff's deputies involved were indicted by a grand jury.

A carpenter, Alan Blanchard, was permanently blinded by a load of birdshot directly to his face. At least 128 Berkeley residents were admitted to local hospitals for head trauma, shotgun wounds, and other serious injuries inflicted by police. The actual number of seriously wounded varies as many of the injured did not seek treatment at local hospitals to avoid being arrested. Local medical students and interns organized volunteer mobile first-aid teams to help protesters and bystanders injured by buckshot, nightsticks, or tear gas. One local hospital reported two students wounded with large caliber rifles as well. Contemporaneous news reports stated that 50 people were injured, including five police officers. Some local hospital logs indicate that 19 police officers or Alameda County Sheriff's deputies were treated for minor injuries; none were hospitalized. However, the UCPD states that 111 police officers were injured, including California Highway Patrol officer Albert Bradley, who was knifed in the chest.

=== State of emergency ===
That evening, Reagan declared a state of emergency in Berkeley and sent in 2,700 California National Guard troops. The Berkeley City Council voted 8–1 against the decision. For two weeks, the streets of Berkeley were patrolled by the troops, who broke up even small demonstrations with tear gas. Reagan was steadfast and unapologetic, saying, "Once the dogs of war have been unleashed, you must expect things will happen, and that people, being human, will make mistakes on both sides."

During the People's Park incident, National Guard troops were stationed in front of Berkeley's empty lots to prevent protesters from planting flowers, shrubs, or trees. Young hippie women taunted and teased the troops, on one occasion handing out marijuana-laced brownies and lemonade spiked with LSD. According to commanding major general Glenn C. Ames, "LSD had been injected into fudge, oranges and apple juice which they received from young hippie-type females." Some protesters, their faces hidden with scarves, challenged police and National Guard troops; hundreds were arrested.

== Aftermath ==
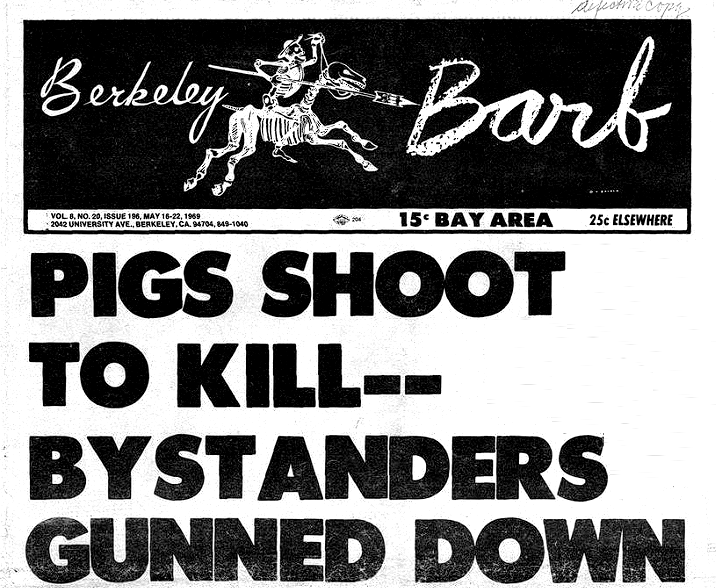
Berkeley Barb cover on People's Park, May 16, 1969

Demonstrations continued for several days after Bloody Thursday. A crowd of approximately 400 were driven from Sproul Plaza to Telegraph Avenue by tear gas deployed by officers on May 19. On May 20, National Guard helicopters flew over the Berkeley campus, dispensing airborne tear gas over protestors that winds dispersed over a wide area, affecting bystanders and people in nearby facilities, including a hospital; this was one of the largest deployments of tear gas during the Vietnam era protests, and an action which Reagan would later admit might have been "a tactical mistake". On Thursday, May 22, 1969, 482 demonstrators were arrested and charged with unlawful assembly, bringing the total number of arrests near 800.

Showing solidarity with students, 177 faculty members said that they were "unwilling to teach until peace has been achieved by the removal of police and troops". On May 23, by 642–95, the Berkeley faculty senate endorsed a proposal by the College of Environmental Designs to have the park become the centerpiece of an experiment in community-generated design. In a separate university referendum, UC Berkeley students voted 12,719–2,175 in favor of keeping the park; the turnout represented about half of the registered student body. Although Heyns supported a proposal to lease the site to the city as a community park, the Board of Regents voted to proceed with the construction of married student apartments in June 1969.

=== Peaceful protest ===
By May 26, the city-wide curfew and ban on gatherings had been lifted, although 200 members of the National Guard remained to guard the fenced-off park, anticipating unrest from a march planned for May 30. Reagan pledged that "whatever force is necessary will be on hand", although protest leaders declared the march would be non-violent. Demonstrators engaged in shop-ins, park-ins, and other non-violent tactics to counter the police action. On May 30, 30,000 Berkeley citizens secured a city permit and marched without incident past the barricaded People's Park to protest Reagan's occupation of their city, the death of Rector, the blinding of Blanchard, and the many injuries inflicted by police. Young women slid flowers down the muzzles of bayoneted National Guard rifles, and a small airplane flew over the city trailing a banner that read, "Let A Thousand Parks Bloom". Nevertheless, over the next few weeks National Guard troops broke up any assemblies of more than four people who congregated for any purpose on the streets of Berkeley, day or night. In the early summer, troops deployed in downtown Berkeley surrounded several thousand protesters and bystanders, emptying businesses, restaurants, and retail outlets of their owners and customers, and arresting them en masse.

=== Responses to violence ===
The Black Panther, the official newspaper of the Black Panther Party, stated in an issue on fascism that "[The pigs] tear gassed and beat up a lot of innocent people ... The chemical that they used, is the same kind of chemical that the U.S. Imperialists are using against the Vietnamese people." The Washington Post wrote of the incident in an editorial: "[T]he indiscriminate gassing of a thousand people not at the time in violation of any law seems more than a little excessive." The editorial also criticized legislation before the U.S. House that would have "cut off Federal aid to universities which fail to head off campus disorders".

On June 13, Reagan defended his actions in a televised speech delivered from San Francisco; a small sampling of public input (101 telegrams received by the governor's office after the broadcast) suggests that the public was supportive of the governor's actions.

== Legacy ==
In an address before the California Council of Growers on April 7, 1970, Reagan defended his policies for dealing with campus protests: "If it takes a bloodbath, let's get it over with. No more appeasement." Berkeley Tribe editors decided to issue this quote in large type on the cover of its next edition.
