= List of mayors of Berkeley, California =

Mayor of Berkeley
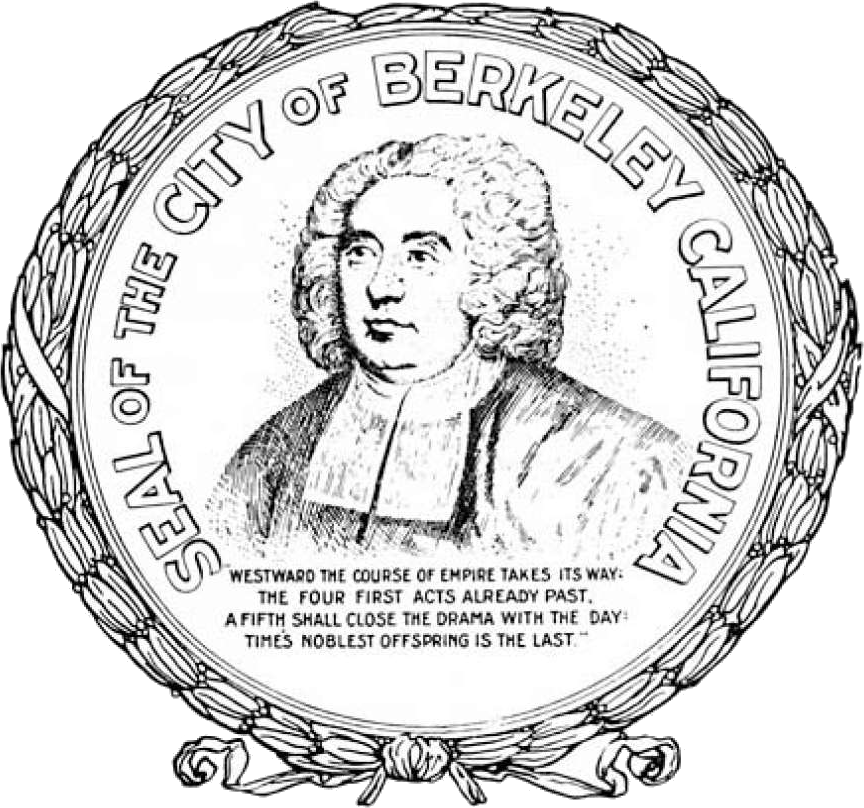
- Seal of the City of Berkeley.
- Incumbent; Adena Ishii since December 6, 2024
- Term length: 4 years renewable
- Formation: 1878
- First holder: Abel Whitton

This is a list of mayors of Berkeley, California. The list includes people serving in the equivalent position of president, in the city's early history.

- Presidents, Town Board of Trustees (1878–1909)
  - Abel Whitton (Workingman's Party) 1878–1881
  - A. McKinstry 1881–1883
  - W.C. Wright (Republican) 1883–1885
  - J.B. Henley 1885–1887
  - Henry L. Whitney 1887–1889
  - Samuel Heywood / Joseph L. Scotchler (Republican) 1889–1891
  - Reuben Rickard (Republican) 1891–1893
  - Byron E. Underwood / Martin J. Acton / Charles S. Preble 1893–1895
  - Reuben Rickard (Republican) 1895
  - John W. Richards 1895–1899
  - William H. Marston 1899–1903
  - Thomas Rickard (Republican) 1903–1909
- Mayors
  - Beverly L. Hodghead (Democrat) 1909–1911
  - J. Stitt Wilson (Socialist) 1911–1913
  - Charles D. Heywood (Republican) 1913–1915
  - Samuel C. Irving (Democrat) 1915–1919
  - Louis Bartlett (Republican) 1919–1923
  - Frank D. Stringham (Republican) 1923–1927
  - Michael B. Driver (Republican) 1927–1930
  - Thomas E. Caldecott (Republican) 1930–1932
  - Edward N. Ament (Republican) 1932–1939
  - Frank S. Gaines (Republican) 1939–1943
  - Fitch Robertson (Republican) 1943–1946
  - Carrie L. Hoyt (Republican) 1947 (January–April)
  - Laurance L. Cross (Democrat) 1947–1955
  - Claude B. Hutchison (Republican) 1955–1963
  - Wallace Johnson (Republican) 1963–1971
  - Warren Widener (Democrat) 1971–1979, first African-American mayor
  - Gus Newport, (Berkeley Citizens Action) 1979–1986
  - Loni Hancock, (Berkeley Citizens Action) 1986–1994
  - Jeffrey Shattuck Leiter, 1994 (March–December)
  - Shirley Dean, (Berkeley Democrat Club) 1994–2002
  - Tom Bates, 2002–2014
  - Jesse Arreguín, 2014–2024
  - Adena Ishii, 2024–present
