= Edward N. Ament =

American politician (1860–1949)

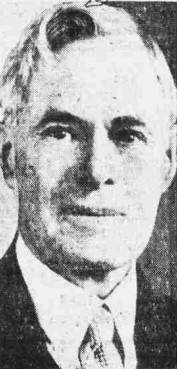
- Ament c. 1932

9th Mayor of Berkeley, California
- In office December 1932 – 1939
- Preceded by: Thomas E. Caldecott
- Succeeded by: Frank S. Gaines

Personal details
- Born: Edward Newton Ament; July 30, 1860 Arcata, California, U.S.
- Died: February 25, 1949 (aged 88) Berkeley, California, U.S.
- Resting place: Sunset View Cemetery, El Cerrito, California, U.S.
- Party: Republican
- Spouse: Florence Moody (m. 1889)
- Occupation: Politician

Edward Newton Ament (July 30, 1860 – February 25, 1949) was an American politician who served as the ninth mayor of Berkeley, California, from 1932 to 1939.

Ament was born in Arcata, California July 30, 1860. In 1889, he married Florence Moody. They had one daughter.

Ament was the proprietor of the Ashby Furniture Company in Berkeley.

Before being becoming mayor, he served as president of the library board which oversaw the construction of the Berkeley Public Library. He was appointed to the Berkeley City Council in May 1932 upon the resignation of Agnes Moody, and became Mayor in December of the same year.

He died of heart failure on February 25, 1949, in Berkeley while sitting in his dentist's waiting room. He was interred at the Sunset View Cemetery in nearby El Cerrito.
