= John T. Gullahorn =

American sociologist

John Taylor Gullahorn (1916–1987) was an American sociologist. His published academic work focused on computer models of human social interaction, and studies of repatriation, notably the W-curve model. His wife, Jeanne, was his research partner and co-author. He taught at Michigan State University.

Gullahorn died of a heart attack in April 1987.

== Education ==
Gullahorn attended the University of Southern California, where he received a bachelor's in sociology in 1937. He would return to the same university for a master's, also in sociology, which he received in 1945.

He pursued a doctorate in sociology, with a focus in industrial sociology and social organization at Harvard University, which he earned in 1953. His PhD thesis was on Social Tensions in Labor Union Relations.

== Career ==
Gullahorn worked as a social case worker for the California State Relief Administration and the Los Angeles County Bureau of Public Assistance from 1937 to 1941.

In June 1943, Gullahorn enlisted in the US Army. His service lasted for approximately 33 months, until he was released in 1946.

Gullahorn began teaching in 1942 at the Citrus Junior College in Azusa, California. He taught sociology from 1941 to 1943, then returned to teach from 1946 to 1948. From 1953 to 1954, Gullahorn taught at Ohio State University as an assistant professor. His next post was at the University of Kansas, where he taught sociology once more from 1955 to 1958. From 1958 until his retirement in 1985, he taught sociology and anthropology at Michigan State University.

Throughout the 1960s, Gullahorn, alongside his wife Jeanne, served as a consultant in artificial intelligence at the System Development Corporation.

== Notable works ==
=== W-curve hypothesis and reverse culture shock ===
Throughout the 1950s, Gullahorn and his wife Jeanne conducted research interviewing American students abroad, French students in America, and recipients of the Fulbright and Smith-Mundt grants which enabled grantees to travel internationally. Findings from this research were published in individual articles, such as "The Social Role of American Students in France" and "American Students Abroad: A French Perspective". The research culminated in the 1963 paper "An Extension of the U-Curve Hypothesis", wherein the pair proposes the W-curve hypothesis of reverse culture shock.

The U-curve is a model of culture shock developed by sociologist Sverre Lysgaard in 1955. He outlines four phases of culture shock:

1. Honeymoon: the traveler finds the new culture exciting
2. Crisis: cultural differences lead to frustration
3. Recovery: the traveler begins to feel more at ease
4. Adjustment: the traveler is fully adapted to rhythm of new culture

The Gullahorns expand the U-curve into the W-curve, adding on additional stages once the traveler returns back home:

1. Honeymoon (at home): the traveler is happy to be back home
2. Crisis (at home): cultural differences emerge, stress due to unexpectedness of finding home strange
3. Recovery (at home): the traveler begins to adapt to being back home
4. Adjustment (at home): the traveler is fully used to being home

This paper "set the stage for considerable subsequent research" on culture shock and is still cited in sociology today.

=== Computer models of social behavior ===
In the mid to late 1960s, the Gullahorns began experimenting with computer models to mimic social behavior.

The first of these studies was 1963's "A Computer Model of Elementary Social Behavior". In order to model how people interact with each other, the Gullahorns created a computer model that would model two people interacting in a social environment. They used George Hosman's Social Behavior as a basis for five propositions of factors of how people interact with each other – ie, if a past interaction between A and B went well, the more likely A and B are to mimic the past interaction – and wrote the program HOMUNCULUS that would simulate an interaction between two "people" that fulfills all of Hosman's propositions and accurately models human behavior.

From this simulation of social behavior between two people, the Gullahorns focused on creating computer models that would accurately model social behavior in small groups. Their models focused on conflict resolution, and comparing computer models to real life survey responses to compare accuracy. Several papers were dedicated to suggesting the computer model as the way forward in sociology.

== Personal life ==
Gullahorn's first wife was Genevieve Jasaitas, with whom he had two children, Gordon and Barbara. His second wife was to become his research partner, the psychologist Jeanne Gullahorn. They had three children, Gregory, Leslie, and Laurie.

== Works ==
- Gullahorn, J. T and Gullahorn, J. E. (1965). The computer as a tool for theory development. In D. Hymes (Ed.), The Use of Computers in Anthropology (pp. 428–448). Mouton & Co.
- ————, (1965). Computer Simulation of Role Conflict Resolution. Michigan State University and Systems Development Corporation.
- ————, (1964). Computer simulation of human interaction in small groups. AFIPS, (Spring), 103–113.
- ————, (1963) A model of elementary social behavior. In E. A. Feigenbaum & J. Feldman (Eds.), Computers and Thought (pp. 375-386). McGraw-Hill.
- ————, (1963). An extension of the u-curve hypothesis. Journal of Social Issues, 19 (3), 33–47.
- ————, (1963). Role conflict and its resolution. The Sociological Quarterly, 4 (1), 32-48.
- ————, (1960). The role of the academic man as a cross-cultural mediator. American Sociological Review, 25 (3), 414-416.
- ————, (1959). American students in France: A perspective on cultural exchange. The French Review, 32 (3), 254-260.
- ————, (1958). American objectives in study abroad. The Journal of Higher Education, 29 (7), 369-374.
- ————, (1957). American students abroad: A French perspective. The Midwest Sociologist, 20 (1), 12-18.
- Gullahorn, J. T., (1959). Teaching by the case method. The School Review, 67 (4), 448-460.
- ————, (1956). Measuring role conflict. American Journal of Sociology, 61 (4), 299-303.
