= USS Stringham =

Two ships in the United States Navy have been named USS Stringham for Silas Horton Stringham.

- The first USS Stringham (TB-19) was a torpedo boat launched in 1899 and sold in 1923
- The second USS Stringham (DD-83) was a Wickes-class destroyer, serving from 1918 until she was decommissioned in 1945
