= Jesse Arreguín =

American politician (born 1984)

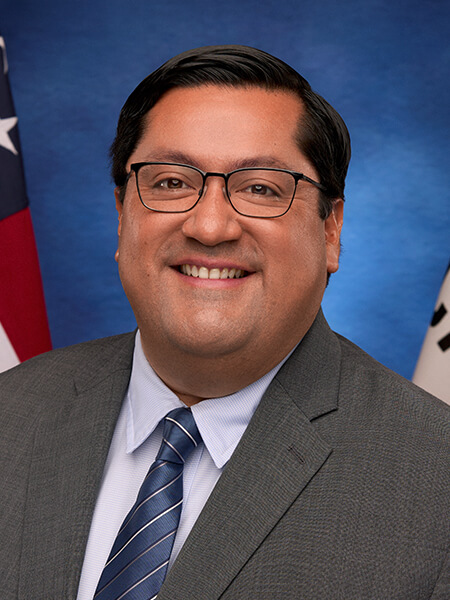
- Official portrait, 2024

Member of the California Senate from the 7th district
- Incumbent
- Assumed office December 2, 2024
- Preceded by: Steve Glazer

22nd Mayor of Berkeley
- In office December 1, 2016 – December 2, 2024
- Preceded by: Tom Bates
- Succeeded by: Adena Ishii

Member of the Berkeley City Council from the 4th district
- In office December 2008 – December 1, 2016
- Preceded by: Dona Spring
- Succeeded by: Kate Harrison

Personal details
- Born: September 4, 1984 (age 42) Fresno, California, U.S.
- Party: Democratic
- Education: University of California, Berkeley (BA)
- Website: Mayor Website; Campaign Website; State Senate Website

Jesse Arreguín (born September 4, 1984) is an American politician serving as a member of the California State Senate since 2024, representing the 7th district. A member of the Democratic Party, he was previously the mayor of Berkeley, California, from 2016 to 2024.

He served on the Berkeley Housing Commission and Rent Stabilization Board from 2004 to 2009 and represented District 4 on the Berkeley City Council from 2009 to 2016. He is the first Latino elected Berkeley's mayor and was one of the youngest mayors in the San Francisco Bay Area.

Arreguín has described himself as an "unapologetic progressive" and said he wants to "restore Berkeley to the forefront of progressive leadership on the environment and social justice."

== Early life ==
Arreguín was born in Fresno, California, and grew up in San Francisco, California. His parents and grandparents were farmworkers. At age 9 Arreguín became involved in the campaign to change the name of Army Street to Cesar Chavez Street in the historically Latino Mission District of San Francisco. Arreguín continued to be involved through efforts against reversing the name change in 1995, described as having "campaigned tirelessly to keep one of the Mission's main thoroughfares named after his idol, Cesar Chavez."

Arreguín was the first in his family to attend college, and attended the University of California Berkeley, where he majored in political science. While at UC Berkeley he served as the City Affairs Director for the Associated Students of the University of California and was elected to the Berkeley Rent Stabilization board in 2004, serving as chair until 2008.

Arreguín has also served on the Housing Advisory Commission, Zoning Adjustments Board, and Downtown Area Plan Advisory Committee.

== Berkeley City Councilmember (2008–2016) ==
From 2008 to 2016 Arreguín served two terms as a Berkeley City Council member representing City Council District 4. On the council Arreguín drafted and passed over 300 pieces of legislation.

He helped increase the city's minimum wage to $15, co-wrote the Downtown Area Plan, passed the Affordable Housing Mitigation Fee used to build affordable housing, created police reform after Black Lives Matter demonstrations, and worked to save the historic Main Post Office.

== Mayor of Berkeley (2016–2024) ==
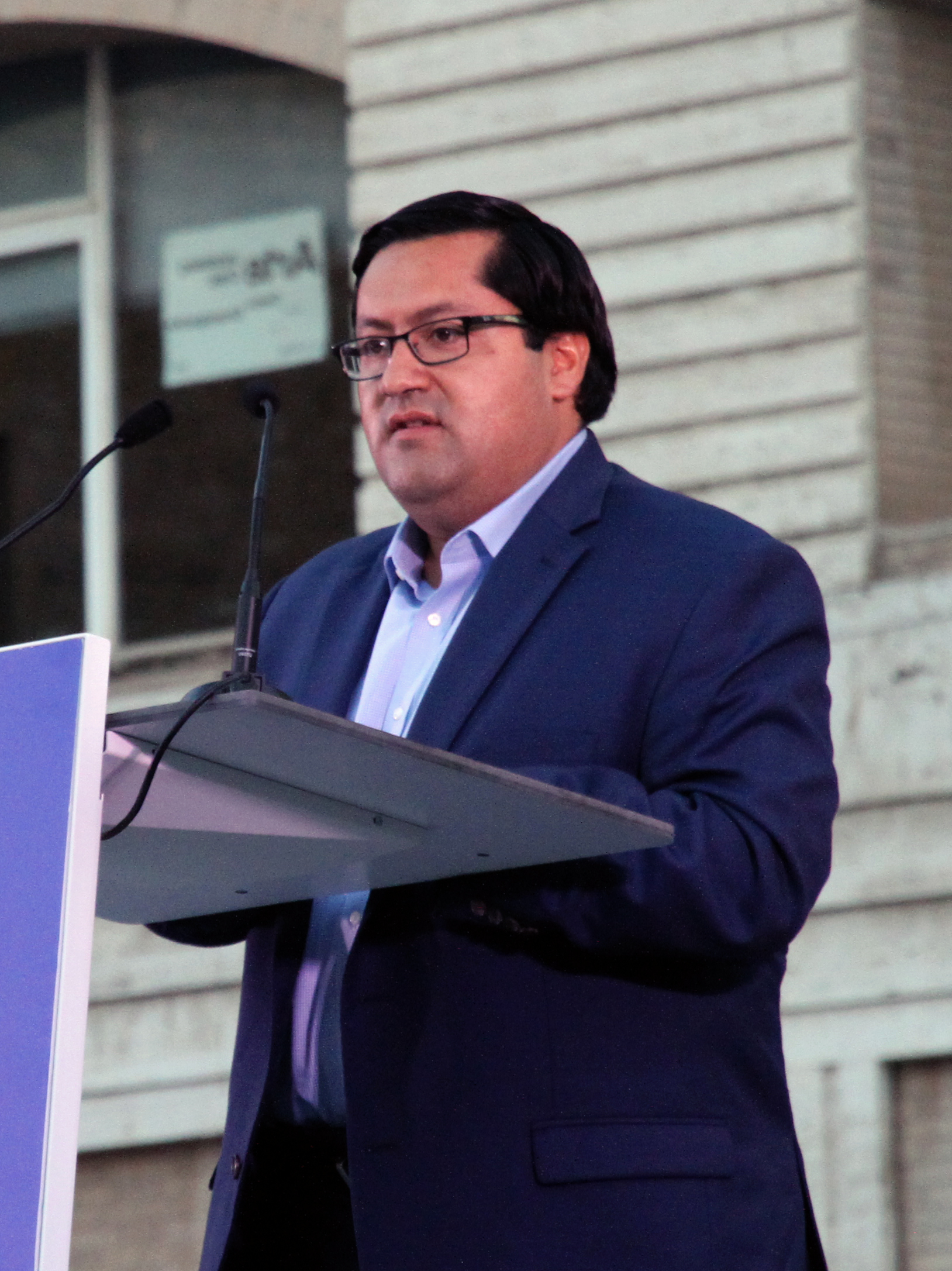
Arreguin in 2017

Arreguín announced his candidacy for mayor of Berkeley in October 2015. He faced seven candidates for the open seat, and was endorsed by U.S. Senator Bernie Sanders of Vermont, the Sierra Club, and the Alameda Democratic Party.

Arreguín won 51% of the vote after ranked-choice tabulation. At age 32, he became the second-youngest mayor in Berkeley's history. He was sworn in on December 1, 2016, and in his inaugural address said that "in light of the national election, Berkeley, now more than ever, needs to lead."

Arreguín won 63% of the vote in the 2020 mayoral election, facing three other candidates. He resigned the mayoralty in November 2024 following his election to the California State Senate.

=== Alt-right speakers and demonstrations ===
When a talk by controversial "alt-right" commentator Milo Yiannopoulos was announced on the University of California, Berkeley campus in February 2017, Arreguín said, "Bigotry is unacceptable. Hate speech isn't welcome in our community." After violent protests caused UC Berkeley to cancel the talk, Arreguín said, "We as a city do not make a decision about inviting a speaker. We do not make a decision to cancel a speaker. This was a decision of the university."

In response to the same incident, Arreguín referred to Yiannopoulos as a "white nationalist," but later retracted this characterization, and instead described him as an "alt-rightist." Arreguín reportedly began receiving death threats from Yiannopoulos supporters across the country after his statements were covered by right-wing news website Breitbart News, Yiannopoulos's employer at the time.

Arreguín reportedly again became a target of death threats when conservative commentator Ann Coulter planned to speak on the UC Berkeley campus and canceled her appearance over safety concerns in April 2017. During protests over Coulter’s appearance, Arreguín was denounced for supporting the far-left group BAMN (By Any Means Necessary), which has incited violent protests, after it became known that he had "liked" their Facebook page. In response, Arreguín said that "following or liking pages does not mean you support what that group is doing," adding, "I am not a member of BAMN, and I do not support the views and the violent actions of that group." He later unfollowed the group.

Following the Charlottesville Unite the Right rally, attention was brought to a far-right rally planned for August 27, 2017, in Berkeley. Ahead of the event, Arreguín stated that his office was "currently exploring all options, including whether we have the legal means to stop this rally from taking place." At a press conference with local leaders including Rep. Barbara Lee and State Sen. Nancy Skinner, Arreguín called for opponents of the rally to hold counter-demonstrations in different locations to avoid violence between groups.

=== Animal rights ===
In April 2017, Berkeley became the second city in the United States to ban the sale of new fur products, after West Hollywood. After the ban's implementation, Arreguín was given an award by PETA recognizing Berkeley's leadership on animal rights and welfare. In 2021, following pressure by animal rights group Direct Action Everywhere, Arreguín co-authored a resolution to require plant-based food options at all city events and buildings, and to aim to reduce the amount the city spends on animal-based foods by half by 2024. The resolution was the first of its kind to pass in the United States.

=== California housing crisis ===
Prior to 2020, Arreguín supported limits to housing development in Berkeley, but has since supported denser development in cities and the elimination of zoning for single family homes. He has been a vocal proponent of denser housing and more residential development. He helped push through legislation to eliminate single-family zoning requirements.

Arreguín used to oppose California legislation that would require cities to allow denser and taller housing near public transport centrals and ease the parking requirements cities can impose on housing developments; the legislation is intended to alleviate the housing shortage in California and reduce greenhouse gas emissions. Arreguín described the bill at the time as a "a declaration of war against our neighborhoods", saying it would remove some of cities' zoning rights and lead to unwanted density in Berkeley. In 2017 Arreguín was at the center of an effort to illegally reject housing planned for development in South Berkeley. The project, proposed by Baran Studio Architecture and owner CS Construction, was for three single-family homes and conformed to all local zoning requirements. The mayor and city council violated California state law with the vote, and the city was subsequently sued on multiple occasions. The project was eventually approved and built. The story was also the subject of a lengthy New York Times piece on the housing affordability crisis.

Arreguín supported the construction of 1,100 housing units for students and 125 housing units for homeless people on part of People's Park.

In 2023, Berkeley was approving housing construction at the fastest rate in decades.

=== Climate change ===
After Trump's withdrawal of the United States from the Paris Agreement in June 2017, Arreguín pledged along with 350 other mayors "to uphold the Paris Agreement goals even though President Donald Trump pulled the U.S. out of the international agreement to combat climate change."

=== Divestment ===
In May 2017 Arreguín co-sponsored the successful resolution to divest the City of Berkeley from Wells Fargo Bank in response to allegations that the bank opened fraudulent deposit accounts, the bank's financing of private prisons and the Dakota Access Pipeline.

=== Immigration ===
Prior to his swearing-in, Arreguín vowed as mayor-elect alongside City Council members that "Berkeley would remain a sanctuary city and continue to shield its undocumented residents from deportation." In January 2017, following the release of Donald Trump's executive orders calling for the construction of a border wall, and enforcement of immigration law including the withholding of federal funds from sanctuary cities, Arreguín released a statement along with other progressive mayors in the region opposing the "hateful and harmful policies."

With Arreguín's backing, the Berkeley City Council voted in March 2017 to divest from companies involved in constructing the proposed border wall with Mexico, becoming one of the first cities in the country to do so. The council also passed a resolution calling for the impeachment of Donald Trump, co-sponsored by Arreguín, who said, "Every day there’s a new ethical problem that warrants impeachment."

=== Israel-Palestine ===
Arreguín was one of 18 Bay Area officials in May 2022, who took part in the Jewish Community Relations Council of San Francisco’s Israel Seminar, a 10-day tour of Israel that includes conversations with “speakers from all perspectives” of the conflict, according to Tyler Gregory, the council’s CEO. The JCRC paid for Arreguín's travel. Arreguín faced criticism from dozens of pro-Palestinian protestors, he defended himself saying “This was an important experience for me, not just to be a more effective advocate for peace in the Middle East, but also to be a more effective public servant for a community with a large Jewish and Palestinian community,” he said. “Interpreting my travels as an endorsement of how either side has managed the conflict would be an unfortunate mistake.” Critics included former Berkeley mayor Gus Newport, campus lecturer and co-founder of Zaytuna University Hatem Bazian and Jewish Voice for Peace member Ellen Brotsky, and spokesperson for the Arab Resource and Organizing Center Wassim Hage.

== California State Senate (2024–present) ==
=== Campaign ===
Arreguín announced his state senate campaign in February of 2023, he stated "I believe that my experience and my positions are best aligned with Senator Skinner, and I want to continue her work — recognizing that those are big shoes to fill."

Arreguín ran for a seat in the California State Senate from California's 7th senatorial district in 2024, running against Jovanka Beckles, Dan Kalb, Kathryn Lybarger, and Sandré Swanson. He was endorsed by the California Democratic Party, United Farm Workers, Planned Parenthood, Governor Gavin Newsom, State Senator Nancy Skinner, and Assemblymember Buffy Wicks.

Arreguín won the primary in first place with Jovanka Beckles in second.

Arreguín defeated Jovanka Beckles in the general election replacing State Senator Nancy Skinner. After learning of Donald Trump's Presidential win, Arreguín stated, "Now more than ever, California is going to have to lead this country, and stand for our democracy and our progressive values, and not just resist but show the kind of transformational leadership this country needs, I’m ready to step up and help lead that effort."

=== Tenure ===
Arreguín was sworn in on December 3, 2024. Immediately upon being sworn in, Arreguín introduced Bill SB 9, which, after its 2025 passage, removes the requirement that a property owner must live in the property in order to build or have an accessory dwelling unit.

Jesse Arreguín was appointed as chairman of the public safety committee and human services committee. In 2025, he was appointed chair of his chamber's housing committee by incoming President pro tempore Monique Limón. He is also a member of the Energy, Utilities and Communications; Local Government; Transportation; and Business, Professions and Economic Development Committees.

Following President Donald Trump’s announcement that local officials who interfered with deportation efforts would face investigation, Arreguín responded during a press conference, stating, "I’m sure all my colleagues will stand with me and say, ‘Come after us if you wanna arrest us for protecting our communities."

== Other roles ==
Arreguín is the vice president of the Association of Bay Area Governments, the Bay Area's regional planning agency and Council of Governments. Arreguín is chair and representative on the Bay Area Regional Collaborative Governing Board representing the Association of Bay Area Governments. He also chairs the Council's Agenda and Rules Committee, and serves on the Council's Budget and Finance Committee and 4x4 Joint Committee on Housing.

== Electoral history ==
=== Berkeley City Council ===
2008 Berkeley City Council 4th district election
Party	Candidate	Votes	%
Nonpartisan	Jesse Arreguín	2,992	48.3
Nonpartisan	Terry Doran	2,283	36.8
Nonpartisan	Asa Dodsworth	395	6.4
Nonpartisan	L. A. Wood	368	5.9
Nonpartisan	N'Dji "Jay" Jockin	120	1.9
Write-in		38	0.6
Total votes		6,196	100.0

2010 Berkeley City Council 4th district election
Party	Candidate	Votes	%
Nonpartisan	Jesse Arreguín (incumbent)	2,537	53.5
Nonpartisan	Jim Novosel	1,489	31.4
Nonpartisan	Bernt Rainer Wahl	504	10.6
Nonpartisan	Eric Panzer	185	3.9
Write-in		25	0.5
Total votes		4,740	100.0

=== California State Senate ===
2024 California State Senate 7th district election
Primary election
Party	Candidate	Votes	%
Democratic	Jesse Arreguín	61,892	32.1
Democratic	Jovanka Beckles	34,085	17.7
Democratic	Dan Kalb	28,881	15.0
Democratic	Kathryn Lybarger	28,070	14.6
Democratic	Sandré Swanson	22,907	11.9
Republican	Jeanne Solnordal	16,855	8.7
Total votes		192,690	100.0
General election
Democratic	Jesse Arreguín	199,423	57.2
Democratic	Jovanka Beckles	149,415	42.8
Total votes		348,838	100.0
Democratic hold			
