= Warren Widener =

American lawyer

Warren Hamilton Widener
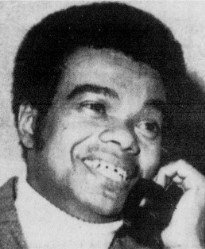

Mayor of Berkeley, California
- In office 1971–1979
- Preceded by: Wallace J.S. Johnson
- Succeeded by: Gus Newport

Member of the Alameda County Board of Supervisors from District 5
- In office 1989–1993
- Preceded by: John George
- Succeeded by: Keith Carson

Personal details
- Born: 25 March 1938 Oroville, California
- Died: 25 June 2013 (aged 75) Hayward, California
- Party: Democratic

Warren Hamilton Widener (25 March 1938 – 25 June 2013) was a former Mayor of Berkeley, California, and former member of the Alameda County Board of Supervisors. He was the first African American mayor of Berkeley, serving two terms from 1971 to 1979. Before entering politics Widener worked as an attorney and was President of the Urban Housing Institute.

Widener was born on March 25, 1938, in Oroville, California. He died on June 25, 2013, in Hayward, California, aged 75. He served as a captain in the U.S. Air Force, then earned his law degree at Boalt Hall at UC Berkeley. He subsequently served as president of the Urban Housing Institute near the UC campus.

== Political career ==
After election in 1969 to a four-year term the Berkeley City Council, Widener, 33, ran for Mayor in 1971 against Vice-Mayor Wilmont Sweeney. (Sweeney was first black member of the nine-member Council, elected in 1961; future Congressman Ron Dellums the second, elected in 1967; and Widener the third.)

"Although he was Berkeley's first black mayor, most black voters backed his opponent. Widener won the election due to a large turnout of the University's student population," according to Ebony Magazine.

At the first meeting of the newly sworn-in 1971 City Council meeting, three members of the council refused to say the Pledge of Allegiance, but Widener and others participated.

Widener had been elected by many progressive voters in 1971, but those same voters perceived him as shifting to the right after his election. In 1973, Widener endorsed the Berkeley Four, a "slate of liberal Democratic types." Student turnout went down 20 from 1971 while there was a 75 per cent turnout in the Berkeley Hills, the wealthier side of the city.

In 1975, Berkeley Citizens' Action, a coalition of progressives, radicals and reformers, nominated Ying Lee Kelley to run against Widener. Relying upon support of the liberal Berkeley Democratic Club, Widener defeated Kelley and Carl Finamore of the Socialist Workers Party.

In 1979, the BCA's nominee Gus Newport defeated Widener.

In 1988, Widener ran successfully for the District 5 seat on the Alameda County Board of Supervisors, succeeding John George, but was defeated by Keith Carson when he sought re-election in 1992.

== Other activities ==
Widener was a past-president of the Berkeley Repertory Theater.

== See also ==
- List of first African-American mayors
- African American mayors in California
