= Fitch Robertson =

American politician (1896–1956)

11th Mayor of Berkeley, California
- In office 1943 – January 1947
- Preceded by: Frank S. Gaines
- Succeeded by: Carrie L. Hoyt

Personal details
- Born: February 12, 1896 Pueblo, Colorado, U.S.
- Died: March 5, 1956 (aged 60) Walnut Creek, California, U.S.
- Party: Republican
- Spouse: Myla Kenworthy
- Children: 4
- Education: Colorado School of Mines
- Occupation: Politician

Military service
- Allegiance: United States
- Branch/service: United States Army
- Battles/wars: World War I

Fitch Robertson (February 12, 1896 – March 5, 1956) was an American politician who served as the 11th mayor of Berkeley, California, from 1943 to 1947.

He was born February 12, 1896, in Pueblo, Colorado.

Robertson was a graduate of the Colorado School of Mines. He served during World War I in a U.S. Army engineering battalion. He came to Berkeley in 1929. He married Myla Kenworthy, with whom he had four children. A member of the BPOE Berkeley Elks Lodge # 1002.

After the City Manager announced his intention to resign as of January 15, 1947, the Berkeley City Council chose Mayor Robertson to replace him which it did on January 20. The Vice Mayor, 80-year-old Carrie Hoyt then assumed the office of Mayor to finish out Robertson's term, thus becoming Berkeley's first female mayor.

Robertson died at his Walnut Creek, California home on March 5, 1956.
