= Carrie L. Hoyt =

American politician (1866–1950)

12th Mayor of Berkeley, California
- In office January 20, 1947 – April 1947
- Preceded by: Fitch Robertson
- Succeeded by: Laurance L. Cross

Personal details
- Born: Carrie Knoles; October 24, 1866 Petersburg, Illinois, U.S.
- Died: March 25, 1950 (aged 83) Berkeley, California, U.S.
- Party: Republican
- Spouse: William Hoyt (m. 1888)
- Children: 4
- Occupation: Politician

Carrie L. Hoyt (October 24, 1866 – March 25, 1950) was an American politician who served as the 12th mayor of Berkeley, California, from January 20 to circa May 1947. She is notable for having been Berkeley's first female mayor.

Hoyt was born Carrie Knoles in Petersburg, Illinois, on October 24, 1866. Her father was a lawyer, newspaper publisher and Civil War veteran. In 1887, the Knoles family moved to San Diego County where her father was U.S. Commissioner for Southern California, prosecuting smuggling cases. She met, and in 1888, married, William Hoyt. They had four children.

In 1909, the Hoyts moved to Berkeley. She was elected to the Berkeley City Council in 1923, the first year of the city manager form of government. After the city manager announced his intention to resign as of January 15, 1947, the Berkeley City Council chose Mayor Fitch Robertson to replace him, which it did on January 20. As the vice mayor, 80-year-old Hoyt then assumed the office of mayor to finish out Robertson's term, thus becoming Berkeley's first female mayor.

Hoyt died on March 25, 1950, at her home in Berkeley.

Her son, Ralph E. Hoyt, became Alameda County District Attorney and, later, a judge of the Superior Court.
