= Claude B. Hutchison =

American politician

- Born: Claude Burton Hutchison; April 9, 1885; Chillicothe, Missouri, U.S.
- Died: August 25, 1980 (aged 95)
- Children: 5

Academic background
- Education: University of Missouri (BS); Cornell University (MS); Harvard University (MS)

Academic work
- Discipline: Botany · agricultural science · education
- Sub-discipline: Plant breeding Agricultural economics Academic administration
- Institutions: University of Missouri; Cornell University; University of California

Mayor of Berkeley
- In office 1955–1963
- Preceded by: Laurance L. Cross
- Succeeded by: Wallace J. S. Johnson

Personal details
- Party: Republican

Claude Burton Hutchison (April 9, 1885 – August 25, 1980) was an American botanist, agricultural economist, educator, and politician who served as the mayor of Berkeley, California, from 1955 to 1963.

== Early life ==
Hutchison was born on April 9, 1885, in Livingston County near Chillicothe, Missouri, the son of farmer William Moses Hutchison and his wife Ada Smith. Hutchison earned a Bachelor of Science degree from the University of Missouri, where he was also a founding member of FarmHouse fraternity. He was also a member of the Iota Phi chapter of Alpha Phi Omega.

He earned a Master of Science from Cornell University and another from Harvard University.

== Career ==
Hutchison held teaching positions at the University of Missouri and Cornell University. At Cornell he taught genetics to Barbara McClintock. Hutchison left Cornell for the University of California, Davis. where he was professor of agriculture from 1922 to 1952; dean of the College of Agriculture from 1922 to 1925; and vice president of the University of California from 1945 to 1952.

When he left UC Davis, he served as dean of agriculture at the University of Nevada, Reno until his retirement in 1954. From 1955 to 1963, he was the mayor of Berkeley, California.

In the 1920s, Hutchison went to Europe, serving as director of agricultural education for the International Education Board in Paris. In the 1930s, he was a director of the Giannini Foundation of Agricultural Economics.

== Personal life ==
Hutchison married Roxie Pritchard in 1908 and had five children. Hutchison died on August 25, 1980, at the age of 95.

== Honors ==
Hutchison Hall at the University of California, Davis is named for him.
