= J. Stitt Wilson =

American politician (1868–1942)

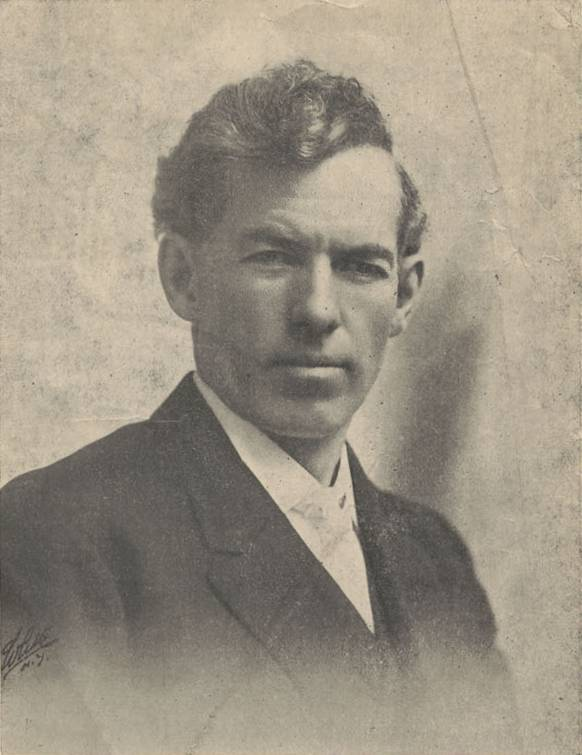
- Wilson c. 1916

Mayor of Berkeley, California
- In office July 1, 1911 – July 1, 1913
- Preceded by: Beverly L. Hodghead
- Succeeded by: Charles D. Heywood

Member of the California State Relief Commission
- In office May 22, 1939 – April 29, 1940
- Appointed by: Culbert Olson
- Preceded by: Frank Y. McLaughlin
- Succeeded by: Norman W. Pendleton

Member of the California State Social Welfare Board
- In office May 22, 1939 – August 28, 1942
- Appointed by: Culbert Olson
- Preceded by: Frank Y. McLaughlin
- Succeeded by: John C. Cuneo

Personal details
- Born: March 19, 1868 Auburn, Ontario
- Died: August 28, 1942 (aged 74) Berkeley, California
- Party: Socialist (before 1934); Democratic (after 1934)
- Spouse: Emma Agnew
- Children: William; Melnotte; Gladys; Violette
- Relatives: Irving Pichel (son-in-law)
- Education: Northwestern University

Jackson Stitt Wilson (March 19, 1868 – August 28, 1942) was a Canadian-born American politician. He was a Christian socialist and suffragist, and held Georgist economic views. A member of the Socialist Party of America, Wilson was the mayor of Berkeley, California from 1911 to 1913. He ran for Congress in 1912 on a socialist platform, receiving 40% of the votes cast, but was defeated by the incumbent.

== Early life and education ==
J. Stitt Wilson was born in the small town of Auburn, Ontario in Southwestern Ontario on March 19, 1868, the son of Methodist parents. He emigrated to the U.S. in 1888, settling in Evanston, Illinois, where he attended Northwestern University. After graduation he worked as a schoolmaster and for a law firm. Wilson later decided to enter the Methodist ministry, enrolling at the theological seminary at Northwestern. Following completion of his schooling, Wilson worked for the next four years as a Methodist pastor and social worker in nearby Chicago. He later recalled that the experience of these four years were "to me a school out of which I came — a Socialist."

He later recalled:

Three forces in my life converged into one. ...

First, then, the facts drove me to Socialism. The injustices, misery, and wretchedness, and the unequal struggle of the workers against such frightful odds compelled me to study the underlying causes of this social agony — and I became a Socialist.

Second, I was a student of economics and sociology, reading, observing, meditating, and this led me to Socialism. Socialism is the social order corresponding to truth in the intellect.

And in the third place, I was passing through a series of subjective experiences, experiences of the mind and heart, moral and spiritual growing-pains — and again I became a Socialist.

== Political career ==
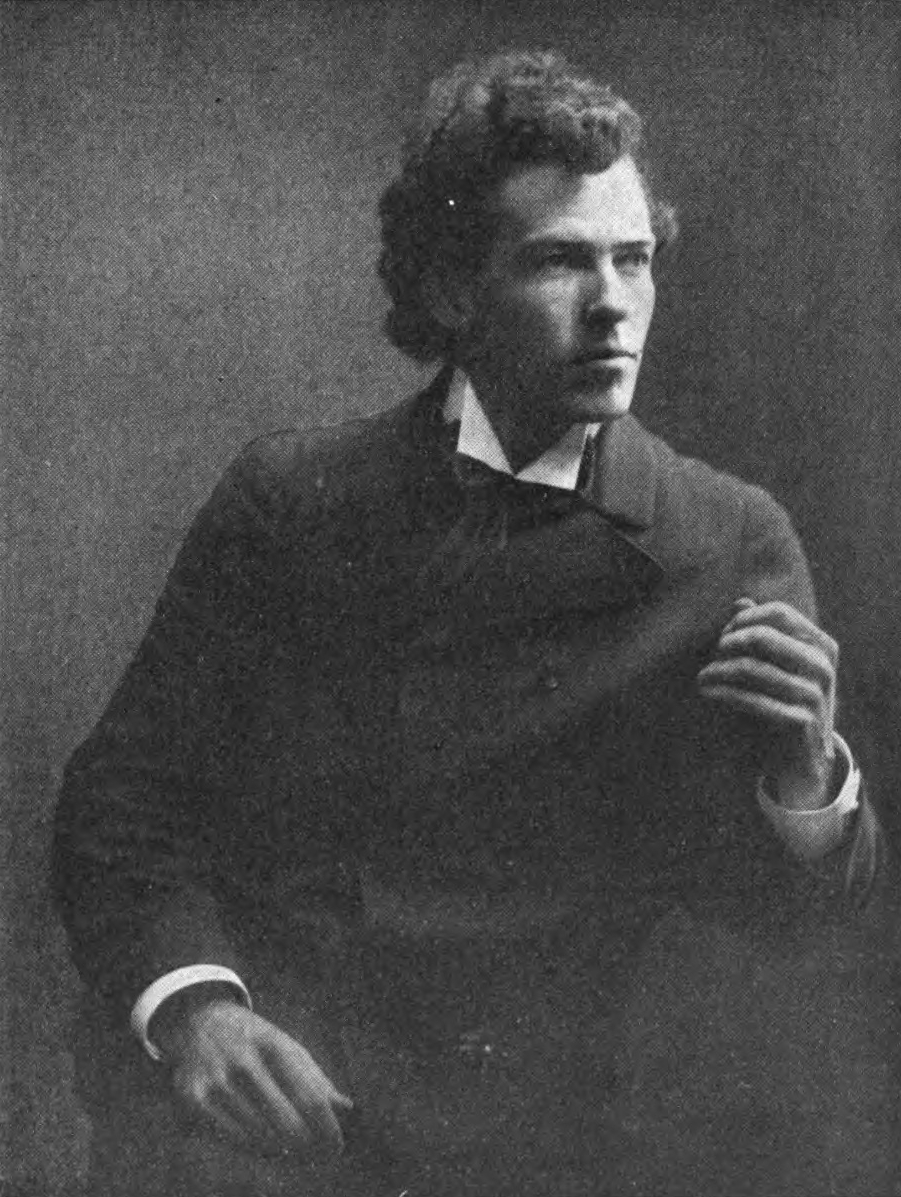
Wilson c. 1901

Wilson first became involved in the organized socialist movement late in the 1890s as an active member of the Brotherhood of the Cooperative Commonwealth, an organization which sought to establish socialist colonies in the new state of Washington with a view to taking over the state government and establishing a cooperative rather than profit-driven economy. Wilson continued to live in Chicago but served as one of eight official "lecturers" for the organization.

Wilson was inspired by what he called "the social and economic significance of the Teachings of Jesus":

The Sermon on the Mount I saw was a code of social duties, so to speak, a revelation of the fundamental principles of Social Justice and human fellow ship for this our everyday world. Such a passage as that beginning with the phrase, "No man can serve two masters," is nothing short of a brief but comprehensive Social Program. It is almost impossible to find in the whole Sermon on the Mount anything that could give an ecclesiastical or theological colour to these sayings. They are ethical, moral, social.

From 1907, Wilson was a contributing editor to The Christian Socialist [Chicago], a weekly newspaper that unified the Christian socialist wing of the Socialist Party of America.

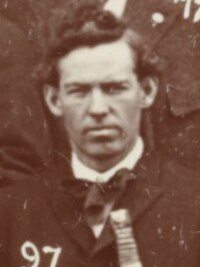
Wilson at the first Socialist Party of America convention in Chicago, 1904

Wilson was a delegate from California to the 1904, 1910, and 1912 national conventions of the Socialist Party. At that 1912 gathering, Wilson joined with Ernest Untermann, Joshua Wanhope, and Robert Hunter as a majority of the Committee on Immigration in offering a resolution on immigration which was pro-exclusionary, backing the American Federation of Labor in its desire to stop manufacturers from importing cheap, non-union labor from the Far East. This proposal, primarily written by Untermann and Wanhope, was effectively killed by the convention on a motion by Usher Solomon of New York not to receive the committee's report, but rather to hold the matter open for investigation and decision by the next convention.

Before he became mayor of Berkeley, Wilson ran for governor of California in 1910 on the Socialist ticket and received 12% of the votes cast. Wilson was elected mayor of Berkeley in 1911 to a two-year term but declined to run for re-election. In 1912, he ran for Congress in the 6th district as a Socialist and received 26,234 votes, 40% of the votes cast, but was defeated by incumbent Republican Joseph R. Knowland. He was elected to the governing National Executive Committee of the Socialist Party in 1914.

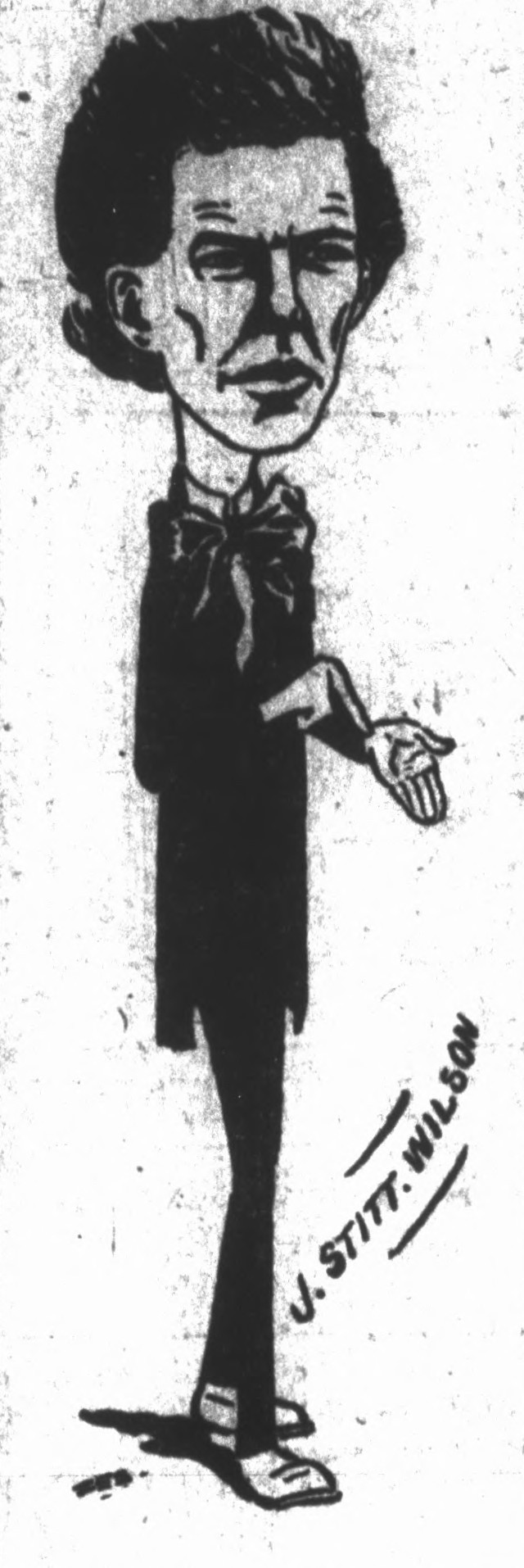
Caricature of Wilson, 1910

Wilson believed that there was an "impending social revolution" in the economic relations of man marked by the principle of "social ownership by the whole people of the basic equipment of land and machinery." Wilson asserted in a 1911 pamphlet that this social revolution was "now on" and declared

If God is ever to wipe away the tears from the face of man this age-long wrong [capitalism] must be overthrown. If the mission of Jesus is ever to get the upper hand in human affairs, the social revolution must come to pass. There is no more good news to the poor unless there is the message and the task to abolish this age-long night of poverty. There is no deliverance for captives unless this social captivity is ended. There is no setting at liberty the people that are bruised unless this age-long bruising machinery is stopped. If we are ever to call the poor and the maimed and the halt to the banquet of creation, the program of the revolution must be inaugurated. The Heavenly Father may know we have need of all these things, and He may have provided for these needs in the limitless resources of nature, but we never can have them for the people except by seeking the kingdom of social justice and human brotherhood — which is the Kingdom of God — which is the social vision of the social revolution.

Wilson was a strong supporter of the "single tax" movement begun by Henry George, arguing that land gained its value through the collective activity of humanity, not by the individual owner, and that the city, "the Social Mother in whose household we all live" should support itself by taxing this collectively created value. He gained the support of the League of California Municipalities and lead unsuccessful initiative campaigns in 1912 and 1914 to change the California constitution to allow local governments "home rule" in taxation so that they could choose to tax land separately from buildings and personal property.

Not sharing the organization's staunch anti-militarist perspective, Wilson withdrew from the Socialist Party at the outbreak of World War I. He was again writing for the party press by 1922, however.

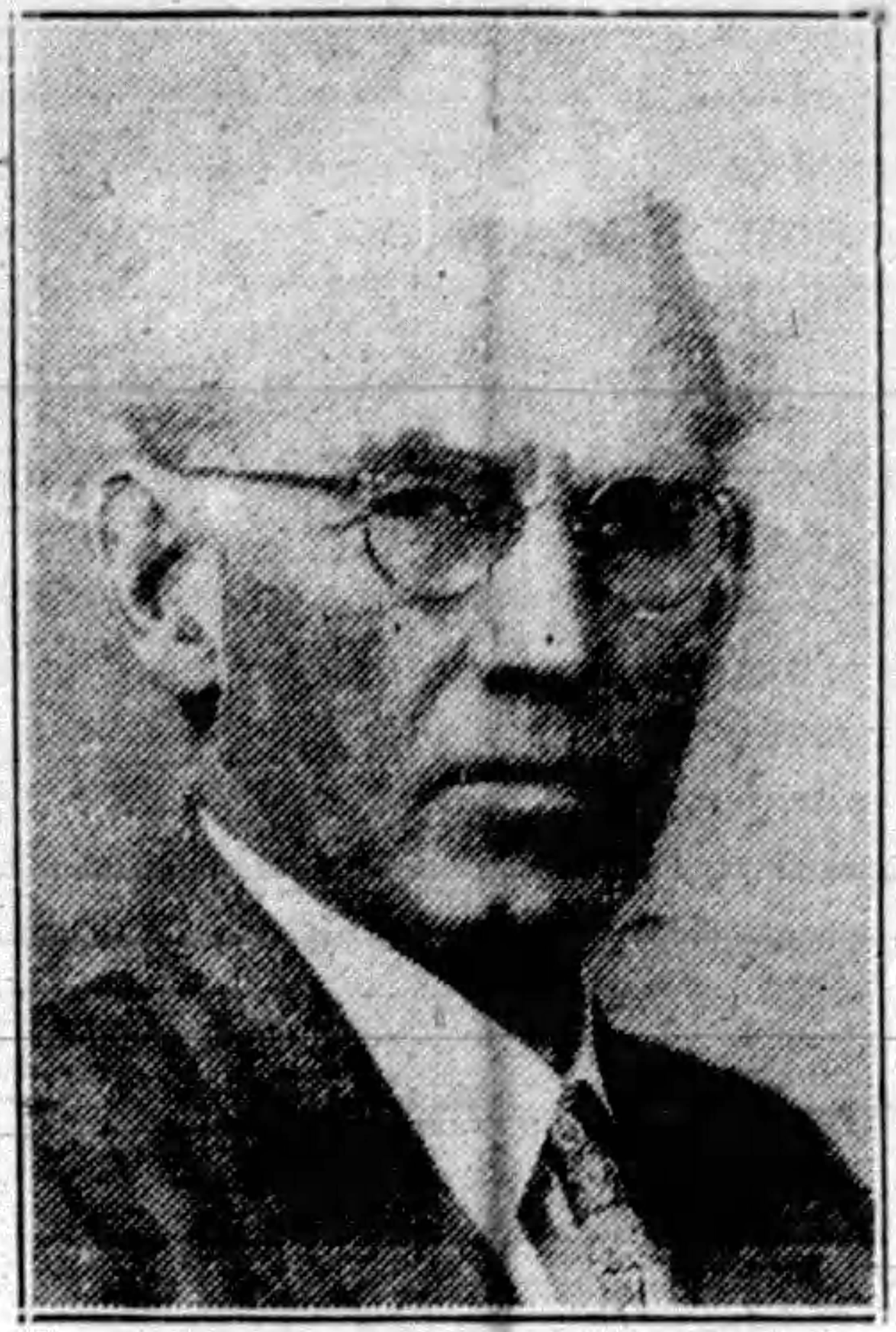
Wilson c. 1937

Wilson re-entered electoral politics during the Great Depression; in 1932, he was the Socialist candidate for Congress in the 7th district, coming in third place with over 22% of the vote. In 1934, he joined the Democratic Party to support fellow Socialist Upton Sinclair in his run for governor of California. Wilson was again a candidate for Congress in 1936, but lost the Democratic primary to incumbent Republican Albert E. Carter by 629 votes out of 38,618 cast.

Wilson was later a delegate to the 1936 and 1940 Democratic National Conventions. He supported president Franklin D. Roosevelt's controversial court-packing plan in 1937, and in 1939 was appointed to the California State Relief Commission and Social Welfare Board by governor Culbert Olson. He held the former position until he was forced to resign because of a law banning members from political activity, and held the latter until his death in 1942. In the former position, he voted to authorize a consumer co-operative pilot program in Los Angeles.

== Death and legacy ==
Wilson's brother Ben F. Wilson c. 1901

Wilson was married to Emma Agnew and had four children. His two sons were William Gladstone and Melnotte. His two daughters, Gladys Viola and Violette, both went into show business. Gladys took the stage name Viola Barry and starred in a series of silent films during the decade of the 1910s. Violette married actor and movie director Irving Pichel.

Wilson's brother was Ben F. Wilson, a fellow Socialist who represented Crawford County in the Kansas House of Representatives during the 1913 session. Their wives were sisters.

Wilson died in Berkeley, California, on August 28, 1942.

== Works ==
- "Socialism in London" (Reprint from The Social Crusader.) Appeal to Reason [Girard, KS], whole no. 179 (May 6, 1899), pg. 2.
- The Message of Socialism to the Church: An Address Delivered Before the Bay Association of Congregational Churches and Ministers, Oakland, September 13, 1904. Berkeley, CA: J. Stitt Wilson, 1904. *
- The Tragic Game of Capitalism: Being an Open Letter to the People of the United States Concerning the Injustice of the Present Social Order. Berkeley, CA: J. Stitt Wilson, 1906.
- The Message of Jesus to Our Times: An Interpretation. Berkeley, CA: J. Stitt Wilson, n.d. [1907?].
- The Impending Social Revolution, or, The Trust Problem Solved. Berkeley, CA: The Social Crusade, 1911. *
- The Hebrew Prophets and the Social Revolution. Huddersfield [England]: J. Stitt Wilson, 1909. *
- The Messiah Cometh: Riding Upon the Ass of Economics. Berkeley, CA: J. Stitt Wilson, n.d. *
- The Bible Argument for Socialism. Berkeley, CA: J. Stitt Wilson, 1911." *
- How I Became a Socialist. Berkeley, CA: J. Stitt Wilson, 1911. *
- How I Became a Socialist, Part Two. Berkeley, CA: J. Stitt Wilson, 1911. *
- The Kingdom of God and Socialism. Berkeley, CA: J. Stitt Wilson, 1911. *
- Moses: The Greatest of Labour Leaders. Huddersfield, England, J. Stitt Wilson, 1909. *
- "The Story of a Socialist Mayor," The Western Comrade, vol. 1, no. 06 (Sept. 1913), pp. 186-187, 196.
- The Harlots and the Pharisees, or, The Barbary Coast in a Barbarous Land; also, The Story of a Socialist Mayor; Letter Declining Mayoralty Nomination. Berkeley, CA: J. Stitt Wilson, 1913.
- The Three Great Hypnotisms. Westwood, MA: The Ariel Press, n.d. [191-?].
- Constructive Christian Democracy: An Outline of Fundamentals. Berkeley, CA: J. Stitt Wilson, 1922.
- The Militant Church and Property; The Militant Church and Public Opinion. Berkeley, CA: J. Stitt Wilson, n.d. [1923?]
- The Christ-Spirit in the Animal World. Berkeley, CA: J. Stitt Wilson, 1925.

Pamphlets denoted with (*) included in J. Stitt Wilson, How I Became a Socialist and Other Papers, Berkeley, CA: J. Stitt Wilson, 1912.

== See also ==
- List of elected socialist mayors in the United States
