= USS Stringham (DD-83) =

Wickes-class destroyer

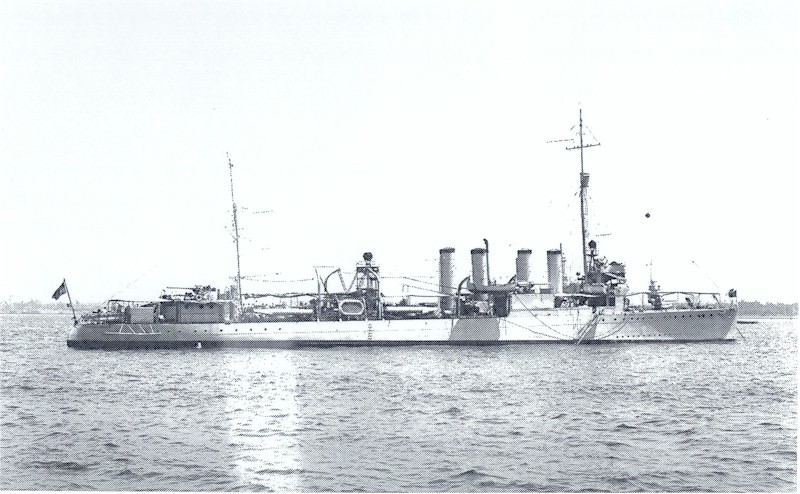
- USS Stringham at anchor

History

United States
- Name: Stringham
- Namesake: Silas Horton Stringham
- Builder: Fore River Shipyard, Quincy, Massachusetts
- Laid down: 19 September 1917
- Launched: 30 March 1918
- Commissioned: 2 July 1918
- Decommissioned: 2 June 1922
- Identification: DD-83
- Recommissioned: 11 December 1940
- Decommissioned: 9 November 1945
- Reclassified: 2 August 1940 as APD-6; 25 June 1945 as DD-83
- Stricken: 5 December 1945
- Fate: Scrapped, March 1946

General characteristics
- Class & type: Wickes-class destroyer
- Displacement: 1,284 long tons (1,305 t)
- Length: 314 ft 4 1/2 in (95.8 m)
- Beam: 30 ft 11 1/4 in (9.4 m)
- Draft: 9 ft 2 in (2.8 m)
- Speed: 35 knots (65 km/h)
- Complement: 103 officers and enlisted
- Armament: 4 × 4 in (102 mm); 2 × 1-pounder; 12 × 21 in (533 mm) torpedo tubes

USS Stringham (DD–83) was a Wickes-class destroyer in the United States Navy during World War I. Later she served in World War II as APD-6. She was the second ship named for Silas Horton Stringham.

Stringham was laid down on 19 September 1917 at Quincy, Massachusetts, by the Fore River Shipbuilding Company. The ship was launched on 30 March 1918, sponsored by Mrs. Edward B. Hill. The destroyer was commissioned on 2 July 1918, Cmdr. Neil E. Nichols in command.

== Service history ==
=== World War I ===
Following commissioning, Stringham was assigned to convoy escort and antisubmarine duty through the end of World War I. Upon her return to the United States in 1919, she was assigned to Destroyer Division (DesDiv) 6 of the Atlantic Fleet Destroyer Force. Except for a six-month period from December 1919 to June 1920 when she was in reduced commission, Stringham remained fully active with the Atlantic Fleet until the middle of 1922. During that time, alpha-numeric hull numbers were adopted by the Navy; and Stringham was redesignated DD-83 effective 17 July 1920. On 2 June 1922, she was decommissioned at the Philadelphia Navy Yard.

=== World War II ===
She remained inactive until 1940, when she was apparently moved to the Norfolk Navy Yard for conversion to a high-speed transport (APD). On 2 August 1940, Stringham was redesignated APD-6.

==== 1940-1942 ====
On 11 December 1940, she was recommissioned at Norfolk, whence she operated until mid-1942. Her duties consisted primarily of escorting coastal convoys from point to point along the eastern seaboard and to various bases in the Caribbean Sea. On 18 April 1942, Stringham attacked an enemy submarine, but could not confirm a kill, even though heavy black oil surfaced soon after her attack. On the following day, she put into Norfolk and participated in amphibious exercises in the Chesapeake Bay through the first week in July.

On 6 July, she got underway from Norfolk in company with a convoy bound for the Panama Canal. She transited the canal on 13 July, reported to the Commander, Southeastern Pacific, and continued west. After stops in the Society and Fiji Islands, she reached Espiritu Santo, in the New Hebrides, on 14 August. Two days later, she put to sea on the first of many resupply voyages to help bolster the marines defending the beachhead on Guadalcanal.

The Guadalcanal campaign was unique among the amphibious operations conducted in the Pacific during World War II. Neither the United States nor Japan enjoyed the overwhelming naval superiority which in almost every other case ensured victory for the greater force. Relative equality made the naval forces of each side a constant threat to the supply lines of the other. Consequently, both sides relied upon the high-speed transport, converted destroyers like Stringham, which were well armed for transports and fast enough to evade more powerfully armed warships. While the contribution of the larger elements of the American fleet cannot be overlooked, the struggle for Guadalcanal was to a great extent the battle of the high-speed transport. Stringham and similar high speed transports succeeded where their Japanese counterparts failed. They kept the marines supplied.

On 23 August, during Stringham's second run to Guadalcanal, a torpedo passed her close astern; and she immediately charged to the attack. She dropped 11 depth charges; forced the submarine to broach; and then lost contact. Although her crew thought at the time they had sunk the submarine, subsequent checking failed to verify their victory. Not long after her scrape with the submarine, Stringham was ordered out to join the group of ships attempting to tow the destroyer Blue, torpedoed the previous evening, into Tulagi. The imminence of the Battle of the Eastern Solomons, however, forced that weak formation to abandon Blue and seek shelter. Accordingly, Blue sank at 2223 on 23 August. Stringham resumed her supply runs in the Solomons until 5 October, when she got underway from New Caledonia to return to the California coast.

==== 1943 ====
After six weeks in the Mare Island Navy Yard, she got underway for the South Pacific. Her return to action, however, was short-lived for—while operating in Pepasala Bay in the Russell Islands on 26 February 1943—a heavy squall forced her aground on a reef. In maneuvering clear of the reef, she was forced to back down to avoid a collision with the destroyer Humphreys and damaged her starboard propeller. After emergency repairs at Tulagi, she was routed back to Mare Island, where she arrived on 16 April.

Over the next six months, Stringham advanced up the Solomons staircase with the American forces. In mid-August, she participated in the landings at Vella Lavella in the central Solomons. That operation cut the Japanese supply lines to Kolombangara and delivered vital air bases to the Americans. On 27 October, she and six other APDs, along with various smaller ships, put a force of New Zealanders ashore at Mono and Stirling islands in the Treasury Islands sub-group. November found her supporting the assault on Bougainville at Empress Augusta Bay.

On the day after Christmas, Stringham joined the American forces which outflanked the Bismarck Barrier at Cape Gloucester, near the western terminus of New Britain. From that position, they could move in two directions—west to pounce upon the back of the New Guinea hen or north to the Admiralties to isolate Kavieng and Rabaul. Stringham participated in one operation in each direction.

==== 1944 ====
On 2 January 1944, she supported the forces which landed at Saidor, New Guinea; and, in March, she assisted in the invasion of Emirau. Between these two operations, Stringham helped land troops in the Green Islands, the northernmost subgroup of the Solomons, located between Buka and New Ireland.

During the spring of 1944, American military thinking focused increasingly upon the Central Pacific invasion route to Japan. Accordingly, Stringham returned to Hawaii with marines embarked; and both she and her passengers commenced preparations for the invasion of the Marianas. The initial waves of assault troops stormed the beaches at Saipan on 15 June. Stringham discharged her marines the following day and patrolled off Saipan throughout the Battle of the Philippine Sea on 19 and 20 June. On 22 June, Underwater Demolition Team (UDT) 7 shifted to her from Brooks for the Tinian phase of the Marianas operation. Until the landings, the high-speed transport conducted sporadic bombardment and harassment fire on Tinian. On 10 July, she sent her UDT men ashore to reconnoiter the two potential landing sites; and, just before the actual assault began on 24 July, her frogmen participated in a daylight feint at Tinian Town to divert Japanese attention from the actual landing sites. On 28 July, she completed her work with UDT 7 in the Marianas and headed for Espiritu Santo, via Eniwetok Atoll.

Stringham, was at Purvis Bay, Florida Island, in the midst of exercises preparatory to the invasion of the Palaus when UDT 7 rejoined her on 5 September. By 12 September, she and her frogmen were off the coast of Angaur with Task Group 32.5. At 1035, she disembarked the UDT men at Peleliu to clear a path through heavy minefields. That afternoon, she towed Afoa to Kossol Passage, and then returned to work with the UDT teams until 27 September, when she headed for Manus. There she was moored alongside Clemson. On the night of 3 October, a fire broke out on Clemson and swept across Stringham amidships and aft, igniting the UDT teams' rubber boats and bags of explosives. Stringham drifted from her moorings after the lines were cut, and her crew finally got the fire under control.

==== 1945 ====
Stringham returned to the United States for overhaul, repairs, and alterations. She did not return to the western Pacific until 17 March 1945. She joined the southern defense group at Saipan and sortied with it for Okinawa on 26 March. The high-speed transport arrived off Okinawa on 2 April, the day following the initial assault, and screened the transport area until 7 April, when she headed for Guam. During that time, Stringham took two kamikazes under fire, one on 3 April and one on 6 April. The former succeeded in crashing LST-599 while the latter gave up his plunge in the face of Stringham's heavy antiaircraft fire, dove on a destroyer, but missed both American ships.

Stringham screened another convoy from Guam to the Ryukyus, reaching Okinawa on 22 April. She remained in the vicinity for five relatively uneventful days; then headed back to Guam. On this voyage, she rendered assistance to the hospital ship, Comfort, which had been crashed by a Japanese kamikaze. Comfort was able to resume course without assistance, but Stringham shepherded her until relieved by Wickes.

While at Guam, Stringham was rammed by La Vallette, a battle casualty. The APD's starboard side was damaged, as was her bridge, her forward crew's compartment, and much of her electrical equipment. Because of this, Stringham was ordered back to San Diego for extensive repairs. On 19 June, she entered San Diego and began conversion back to a destroyer; and, on 25 June, she resumed her former designation, DD-83. In August, the end of the war brought a halt to Stringham's conversion. Later that month, it was determined that she would be decommissioned at Philadelphia. In September, she sailed from San Diego, transited the Panama Canal, and proceeded to Philadelphia, where she reported for duty to the Commandant, 4th Naval District, on 26 September. She was decommissioned on 9 November 1945, and her name was struck from the Navy list on 5 December 1945. Stringham was scrapped at Philadelphia in March 1946.

== Awards ==
- Navy Unit Commendation
- World War I Victory Medal with "ESCORT" clasp
- American Campaign Medal
- American Defense Service Medal with "FLEET" clasp
- Asiatic-Pacific Campaign Medal with nine battle stars
- World War II Victory Medal
