= Charles D. Heywood =

American politician (1881–1957)

3rd Mayor of Berkeley, California
- In office 1913–1915
- Preceded by: J. Stitt Wilson
- Succeeded by: Samuel C. Irving

Personal details
- Born: Charles Dingley Heywood; May 5, 1881 Berkeley, California, U.S.
- Died: March 24, 1957 (aged 75) San Francisco, California, U.S.
- Party: Republican
- Spouse: Ethel (m. 1915)
- Children: 2
- Parent: Samuel Heywood (father)
- Occupation: Politician

Charles Dingley Heywood (May 5, 1881 – March 24, 1957) was an American politician. He was member of a family prominent in the early history of Berkeley, California. He served as mayor of the City of Berkeley from 1913 to 1915. In 1925, he was appointed as the local Postmaster, serving until 1933. He unsuccessfully ran for Congress on the Republican ticket in 1934.

Charles was born in Berkeley on May 5, 1881. His parents were Samuel Heywood and Emma Francis Dingley. His father served as President of the Board of Trustees of the Town of Berkeley from 1889 to 1890.

Charles married his wife Ethel in 1915. They had two daughters, Muriel and Bernice. Heywood died on March 24, 1957, while hospitalized in San Francisco.
