= Viola Barry =

American actress

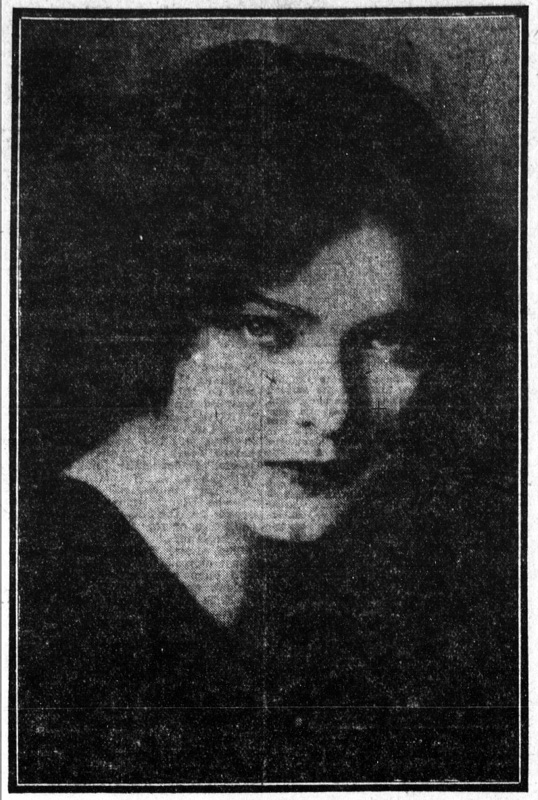
- Born: Gladys Viola Wilson; March 4, 1894; Evanston, Illinois, U.S.
- Died: April 2, 1964 (Aged 70); Los Angeles, California, U.S.
- Occupation: Film actress
- Years active: 1911–1920
- Spouses: Jack Conway (1911–1918); F. McGrew Willis (1921–1957)
- Father: J. Stitt Wilson

Viola Barry (March 4, 1894 – April 2, 1964) was an American silent film actress who starred in a number of films during the 1910s.

== Early years ==
Gladys Viola Wilson was born in Evanston, Illinois, the daughter of Rev. J. Stitt Wilson, a Methodist minister. She moved with her family to Berkeley, California, where her father was a socialist lecturer and was mayor of Berkeley in 1911. She attended Berkeley High School.

She studied under Herbert Beerbohm Tree while she spent more than two years in England, returning to California in December 1909.

== Acting career ==
Before December 1909, Barry was leading woman at Ye Liberty Theater in Oakland, California. In 1910, under her stage name Viola Barry, Wilson signed with the Belasco Theater Company in Los Angeles to be its new ingénue. Previously, she had four years of stage experience, two of these with F. H. Benson's Shakespearean Company in England. Among the heroines she played were Desdemona, Juliet, Ophelia, and Portia. Her first appearance with the Belasco company was in The Test by Jules Eckert Goodman.

She was in movies from 1911 through 1920. Her early screen credits include The Totem Mask, The Voyager: A Tale of Old Canada, McKee Rankin's '49, John Oakhurst, Gambler, An Indian Vestal, Coals of Fire, A Painter's Idyl, The Chief's Daughter, George Warrington's Escape, and Evangeline. All these were completed in her first year in movies.

== Personal life ==
In February 1911, Barry married actor and film director Jack Conway of the Bison Moving Picture Company in Santa Ana, California. They had one daughter, Rosemary. The couple divorced in 1918. Barry later married screenwriter Frank McGrew Willis, with whom she had four children: Virginia, Gloria, McGrew, and James.

Barry was a suffragist and, like her father, a Socialist.

== Death and legacy ==
Barry died in 1964 in Hollywood, California. She was buried at the Mountain View Cemetery in Oakland, California.

== Selected filmography ==
- Help! Help! Hydrophobia! (1913)
- The Mothering Heart (1913)
- The Ranchero's Revenge (1913)
- The Lady and the Mouse (1913)
- A Misunderstood Boy (1913)
- A Frightful Blunder (1913)
- Peeping Pete (1913)
- The Little Tease (1913)
- Almost a Wild Man (1913)
- Twixt Love and Fire (1914)
- His Favourite Pastime (1914)
- John Barleycorn (1914), lost film
- Martin Eden (1914), incomplete film
- The Flying Torpedo (1916), lost film

== Other sources consulted ==
- Los Angeles Times, "Viola Barry at Belasco", November 24, 1910, Page II6.
- Los Angeles Times, "No Failure for Them", February 27, 1911, Page II3.
- Los Angeles Times, "Rites Held for Star of Silent Films", April 7, 1964, Page 32.
