= Dona Spring =

Green Party politician

Member of the Berkeley City Council from the 4th district
- In office 1992 – July 13, 2008
- Succeeded by: Jesse Arreguín

Personal details
- Born: January 22, 1953 Plentywood, Montana, U.S.
- Died: July 13, 2008 (aged 55) Berkeley, California, U.S.
- Party: Green
- Education: University of California, Berkeley (BA)

Dona Spring (January 22, 1953 – July 13, 2008) was an American activist and politician. She served on the Berkeley City Council from 1992 until her death in 2008.

== Early life and education ==
Spring was born in Plentywood, Montana. She graduated from the University of California, Berkeley with honors, earning a bachelor's degree in anthropology and psychology.

== Career ==
Spring worked for many years as an activist devoted to causes such as disability rights, seniors, at-risk youth, poverty, the environment and animal rights. She used a wheelchair for much of her adult life due to rheumatoid arthritis.

Spring was elected to the Alameda County Democratic Central Committee in 1986 and to the county's Green Party County Council in 1990.

Spring was elected to the Berkeley City Council in 1992 as a member of the Green Party of California. She served on the Alameda County Recycling Board from 1997 to 2001, including a stint as its president in 2001. She was elected to her fifth, and last, term to the Berkeley City Council in 2006 with 72% of votes cast. Her last act as a member of the city council was to pledge support for the tree-sitters during the University of California, Berkeley oak grove controversy.

Spring was succeeded in the City Council by Jesse Arreguín, who Spring had encouraged to run for office previously.

== Death ==
Spring died in 2008, aged 55, at Alta Bates Summit Medical Center in Berkeley, after being diagnosed with pneumonia. In July 2008, filmmakers Lindsay Vurek and Valerie Trost released a documentary film about Spring's life, Courage in Life & Politics - The Dona Spring Story.
