= Samuel C. Irving =

American politician (1858–1930)

4th Mayor of Berkeley, California
- In office 1915–1919
- Preceded by: Charles D. Heywood
- Succeeded by: Louis Bartlett

Personal details
- Born: 1858 Cleveland, Ohio, U.S.
- Died: December 2, 1930 (aged 71–72)
- Party: Democratic
- Spouse: Laura Sell (m. 1886)
- Children: 2
- Education: University of California, Berkeley

Samuel C. Irving (1858–1930) was an American politician who served as the fourth mayor of Berkeley, California, from 1915 to 1919.

Irving was born in Cleveland, Ohio in 1858. He came to Berkeley to attend the University of California from which he graduated in 1879. Samuel Irving married Laura Sell in 1886. They had two sons, Fred and Livingston. The family lived in San Francisco in 1900 and Berkeley by 1910.

In 1901, he served on the Board of Regents of the University of California. In 1926, he ran unsuccessfully for the U.S. Senate on the Democratic ticket.

He was the son of Andrew K. Irving, a shipwright who came from New York to San Francisco in 1868 and founded the first shipbuilding yard on the Pacific Coast. Andrew K. Irving also reportedly organized the first labor union on the West Coast.

Irving died on the evening of December 2, 1930 after being struck by a car near his home.
