= USS Stringham (TB-19) =

Torpedo boat of the United States Navy

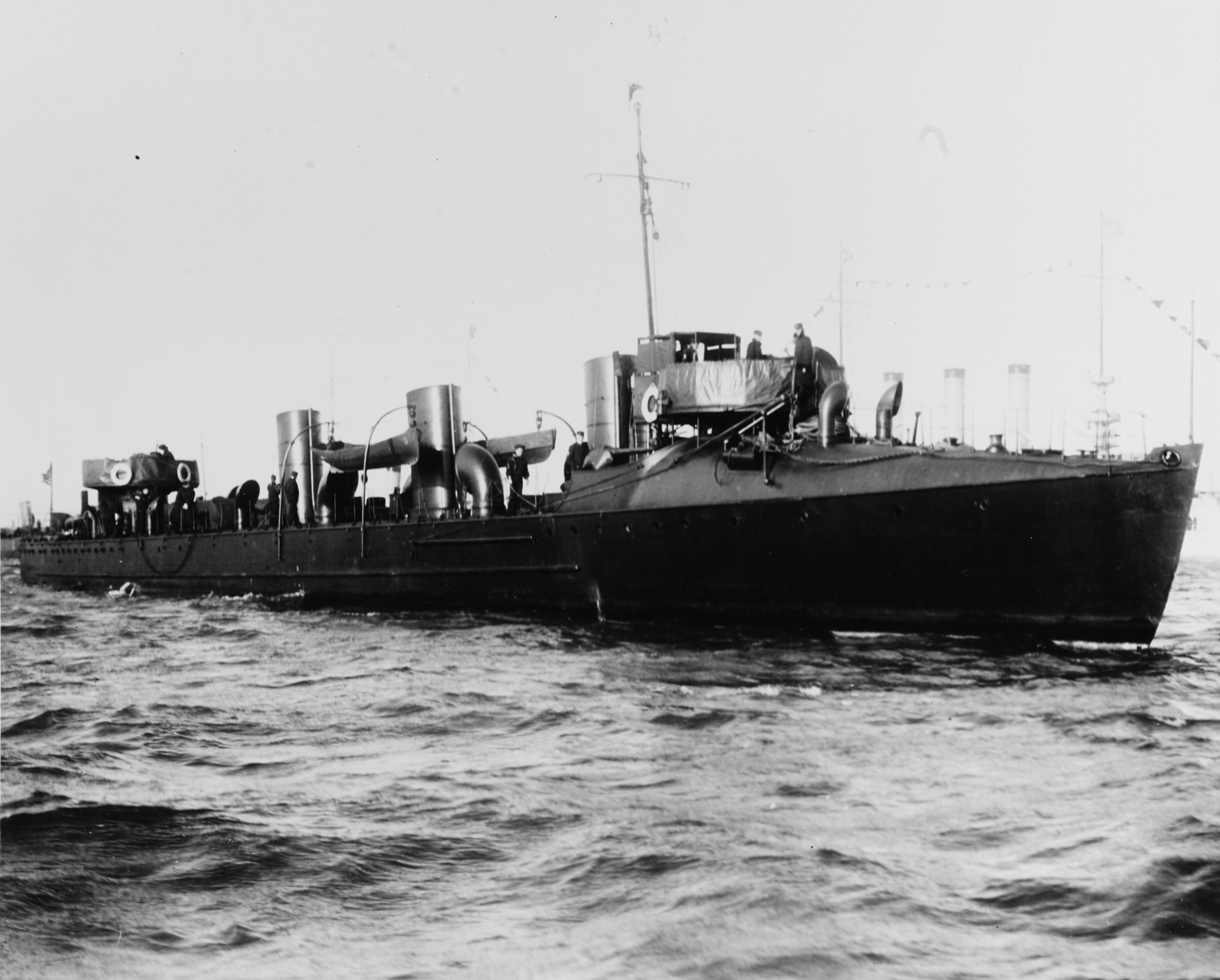
- USS Stringham (Torpedo Boat No. 19) at the Jamestown Naval Review, 1907.

History

United States
- Name: Stringham
- Namesake: Rear Admiral Silas H. Stringham
- Ordered: 3 March 1897 (authorised)
- Builder: Harlan & Hollingsworth, Wilmington, DE
- Laid down: 21 March 1898
- Launched: 10 June 1899
- Sponsored by: Miss Edwina Stringham Creighton
- Commissioned: 7 November 1905
- Decommissioned: 21 November 1913
- Stricken: 26 November 1913
- Identification: TB-19
- Fate: Sold, 18 May 1923, to E. L. Hurst of Roanoke Dock for scrapping

General characteristics
- Class & type: Stringham-class torpedo boat
- Displacement: 340 long tons (345 t)
- Length: 232 ft 4 in (70.82 m)
- Beam: 22 ft (6.7 m)
- Draft: 6 ft 6 in (1.98 m) (mean)
- Installed power: 4 × Thornycroft boilers; 7,300 ihp (5,400 kW)
- Propulsion: vertical triple expansion engine; 2 × screw propellers
- Speed: 30 knots (56 km/h; 35 mph); 25.33 kn (29.15 mph; 46.91 km/h) (Speed on Trial)
- Complement: 59 officers and enlisted
- Armament: 4 × 6-pounder (57 mm (2.24 in)) guns; 2 × 18 inch (450 mm) torpedo tubes (2x1)

USS Stringham (Torpedo Boat No. 19/TB-19) was a steel torpedo boat in the United States Navy. Stringham was named for Silas H. Stringham, who served in the United States Navy from the War of 1812 through the American Civil War.

Stringham was launched on 10 June 1899 by Harlan & Hollingsworth, Wilmington, DE; sponsored by Miss Edwina Stringham Creighton; and was placed in reduced commission on 7 November 1905.

Assigned to the Reserve Torpedo Flotilla at Annapolis, MD, upon completion, Stringham was placed in full commission on 30 October 1906 and assigned to the 3d Torpedo Flotilla, Atlantic Fleet. Stringham operated on the eastern seaboard between Key West, FL and Cape Cod, MA, into 1907. Detached on 11 October 1907 from the Atlantic Fleet, Stringham was placed in reserve, in reduced commission, on 31 January 1908 at the Norfolk Navy Yard.

Placed in full commission again on 1 July 1908, Stringham rejoined the 3d Torpedo Flotilla. She operated primarily out of Newport, RI, through October; then proceeded to Charleston, SC, where she was placed in reserve on 19 November 1908. Recommissioned on 14 August 1909, Stringham was assigned duty as flagship of the 3d Division, Atlantic Torpedo Flotilla, on 9 September. During October, she participated with units of the Atlantic Fleet in the Hudson–Fulton Celebration, steaming up the Hudson as far as Albany, NY, on 8 October. Returning south to Charleston, Stringham was again placed in reserve on 30 November.

Assigned to temporary duty with the 1st Torpedo Division on 1 April 1910, Stringham was transferred to the Engineering Experimental Station at Annapolis, MD, on 14 September. She served as a practice ship and training vessel for midshipmen at the United States Naval Academy from 1911 to 1913.

On 26 July 1912, near Annapolis, Maryland, Stringham successfully received the first radio signal transmitted from an aircraft to a surface ship. Ensign Charles H. Maddox, USN, transmitted "We are off the water, going ahead full speed on a course for the Naval Academy" from an altitude of 300 feet to the Stringham, distant three nautical miles. Later test messages from Maddox's "Wright flyer style" aircraft were received by Stringham at distances of up to 15 miles. Maddox later wrote, "These were the first radio messages ever received from an airplane radio transmitting set in the United States and probably in the world."

Stringham was placed out of commission on 21 November 1913 at the Norfolk Navy Yard, was struck from the Navy list on 26 November 1913, and designated for use as a target on 17 December 1913. Never actually used as a target, Stringham remained at Norfolk until sold on 18 May 1923 to E. L. Hurst of Roanoke Dock for scrapping. While being towed to a scrapyard, the ship broke loose and ended up beached on the tip of Willoughby Spit in Norfolk. In October 2021, the wreck is still there but is deteriorating quickly. wreck at 36°58'00.2"N 76°17'53.3"W .

== Bibliography ==
- Eger, Christopher L. (March 2021). "Hudson Fulton Celebration, Part II". Warship International. LVIII (1): 58–81. ISSN 0043-0374.
- Sieche, Erwin F. (1990). "Austria-Hungary's Last Visit to the USA". Warship International. XXVII (2): 142–164. ISSN 0043-0374.
- History of Communications-Electronics in the United States Navy by Captain L.S. Howeth.
- Additional technical data from Gardiner, Robert (1979). Conway's All The World's Fighting Ships 1860–1905. Conway Maritime Press. p. 157. ISBN 0-85177-133-5.
