= Adena Ishii =

Mayor of Berkeley, California

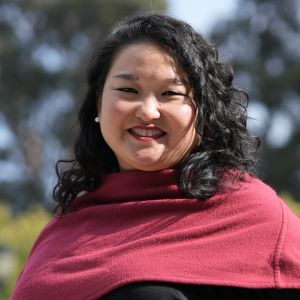
- Official portrait

23rd Mayor of Berkeley
- Incumbent
- Assumed office December 6, 2024
- Preceded by: Jesse Arreguín

Personal details
- Born: 1990 (age 35–36) Los Angeles, California
- Party: Democratic
- Spouse: Andrew Kitirattragarn (m. 2020)
- Relatives: Erika Ishii (sibling)
- Education: University of California, Berkeley (BS); Santa Clara University (JD)
- Website: www.adenaishii.com

Adena Ishii (EE-shee; born 1990) is an American politician serving as the mayor of Berkeley, California since 2024. She is the first Asian American and woman of color to be elected to the position.

== Personal life ==
Ishii was born in Los Angeles and grew up in Agoura Hills, where she graduated from Agoura High School. She has two siblings, including voice actor Erika Ishii. Her parents, Christopher S. Ishii and Carolyn Abe-Ishii, worked in the film industry. Her grandparents include Chris K. Ishii, a Walt Disney Company animator and member of the Military Intelligence Service in World War Two, and Harry F. Abe, a medic in the 442nd Regimental Combat Team. Some of Ishii's Japanese American relatives were incarcerated during World War II in internment camps due to Executive Order 9066.

Ishii married business advisor and former entrepreneur Andrew Kitirattragarn in 2020, and the couple adopted a daughter. They live in South Berkeley.

== Education and early career ==
Ishii attended Berkeley City College in 2009. She later transferred to and graduated from UC Berkeley’s Haas School of Business. She worked for the Alameda County District Attorney's Office. She later received a Juris Doctor degree from Santa Clara University. Ishii worked as a nonprofit education consultant. Ishii was the Voter Services Director for the Berkeley/Albany/Emeryville chapter of the League of Women Voters, later rising to lead the organization. She served as chapter president from 2017 to 2019, making history as both the first woman of color and the youngest person to hold that position.

== Mayor of Berkeley (2024–present) ==
=== Campaign ===
Ishii ran in the 2024 Berkeley mayoral race against Sophie Hahn and Kate Harrison, former District 4 City Council member. Ishii's campaign manager was Cydney Chilimidos.

Ishii's campaign utilized Berkeley's public financing program that capped individual contributions at $60, but matched individual contributions from Berkeley residents at a 6–1 ratio, with a $147,000 cap for mayoral candidates.

During her 2024 campaign, Ishii ran on building more affordable housing and supporting mental health resources. She received several organizational endorsements during her 2024 campaign, including from the Asian Pacific American Democratic Caucus of Alameda County (APADC), Housing Action Coalition, Berkeley Democratic Club, East Bay for Everyone, Run for Something, East Bay YIMBY, and Gun Sense Voter. Ishii was endorsed by State Senator Nancy Skinner and Assembly member Buffy Wicks. She also received an endorsement from Barry Fike, the former president of Berkeley Federation of Teachers.

On November 20, 2024, Ishii's primary opponent Sophie Hahn conceded the race.

=== Tenure ===
Ishii was sworn into office at Berkeley City College on December 6, 2024 and was sworn in again at her first City Council Meeting on December 10, 2024. Upon being sworn in, Ishii stated, "Many of us want to see a kinder country, a better country, a more compassionate country — the first step toward that dream starts here at home. It's time to unite against the kind of forces in our country that threaten our values. It's time to come together as one and create an example: an example of what a progressive city can be in the 21st century."

One day after Trump's second inauguration, Ishii and the rest of the Berkeley City Council unanimously voted to reaffirm the City of Berkeley's status as a sanctuary city. Ishii stated during the city council meeting, "In the current political climate, there are some cities that are actively assisting ICE, and we are taking the stance to reaffirm that we will not be doing that. I feel very lucky to be in a city where this is not a controversial issue."

On August 5, 2025, Berkeley was included in a list of 35 cities, states, and counties identified as "sanctuary jurisdictions" by the U.S. Department of Justice. Ishii responded, reiterating in a statement that "Berkeley continues to take pride in our status as a sanctuary city and we won't be bullied into abandoning our values", explaining "We are not backing down. Berkeley is committed to remaining a safe space for all who live, work, and visit here." Following the list's release, on August 13, a letter addressed to Ishii was sent by U.S. Attorney General Pam Bondi threatening a loss of federal funding and criminal charges against individuals obstructing immigration enforcement. On September 10, Ishii and the rest of the Berkeley City Council unanimously adopted an ordinance codifying Berkeley's sanctuary city rules into the city's municipal code.

In advance of a planned council vote on multiple changes to city rules on the use of public safety technology, Ishii co-sponsored a resolution with councilmember Cecilia Lunaparra rejecting the planned expansion of the City's existing automatic license plate reader (ALPR) contract with Flock Safety to install fixed surveillance cameras, deploy drones for public safety usage, and implement Flock's Nova software platform. In her resolution, Ishii cited previous incidents involving federal immigration agencies accessing the data from license plate readers of other cities without the city's permission or knowledge.
