= Gastonburg, Alabama =

Unincorporated community in Alabama, United States

- Unincorporated community
- Location within the state of Alabama Gastonburg, Alabama (the United States)
- Coordinates: 32°12′26″N 87°26′14″W
- Country: United States
- State: Alabama
- County: Wilcox
- Elevation: 220 ft (67 m)
- Time zone: UTC-6 (Central (CST))
  - Summer (DST): UTC-5 (CDT)
- Area code: 334

Gastonburg is an unincorporated community in Wilcox County, Alabama, United States, located on Alabama State Route 5.

== Geography ==
Gastonburg is located at 32.20736°N 87.43749°W and has an elevation of 220 feet (67 m).

== Demographics ==
Historical population
Census	Pop.	Note	%±
1910	145		—
1920	140		−3.4%
1930	136		−2.9%
U.S. Decennial Census

Gastonburg was listed on the 1910-30 U.S. Censuses as an incorporated town. It disincorporated at some point after 1930.

== Notable person ==
- Laurance L. Cross, Presbyterian minister and mayor of Berkeley, California from 1947 to 1955
