= Frank D. Stringham =

American lawyer

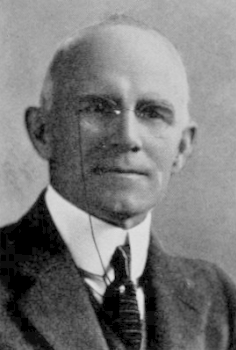

6th Mayor of Berkeley, California
- In office 1923–1927

Personal details
- Born: Frank Devello Stringham; December 9, 1872 Topeka, Kansas, US
- Died: December 7, 1931 (aged 58) Berkeley, California, US
- Resting place: Mountain View Cemetery
- Spouse: Juliet White Garber (m. 1905)
- Education: UC Berkeley
- Occupation: Lawyer

Frank Devello Stringham (1872–1931) was an American politician who served as the sixth mayor of Berkeley, California, from 1923 to 1927. As mayor, Stringham was notable for leading the effort to adopt the city manager form of government. Prior to becoming mayor, Stringham served as Berkeley's City Attorney. In 1928, Stringham was appointed to serve as a director on the board of the East Bay Municipal Utility District. The 1923 Berkeley Fire occurred during Stringham's term as mayor.

== Biography ==
Frank Stringham was born on December 9, 1872, in Topeka, Kansas. He attended the University of California, Berkeley where his uncle, W. Irving Stringham, was a professor of mathematics. He graduated in 1895, attended Tolland Law School for two years, and was admitted to the California bar in 1897.

Stringham married Juliet White Garber (died June 2, 1955) on November 23, 1905. She was the daughter of a prominent local judge who had owned much of the land upon which the Claremont district was developed. Frank Stringham and his wife donated some of the property to the City of Berkeley for a park which was named for her father: John Garber Park. Frank Stringham began his law studies while working for Judge Garber's firm. As an attorney, Frank Stringham had also been associated with former Berkeley Mayor Beverly Hodghead.

Stringham died at his Berkeley home on December 7, 1931, and was buried at the Mountain View Cemetery in Oakland.
