= Beverly L. Hodghead =

American lawyer

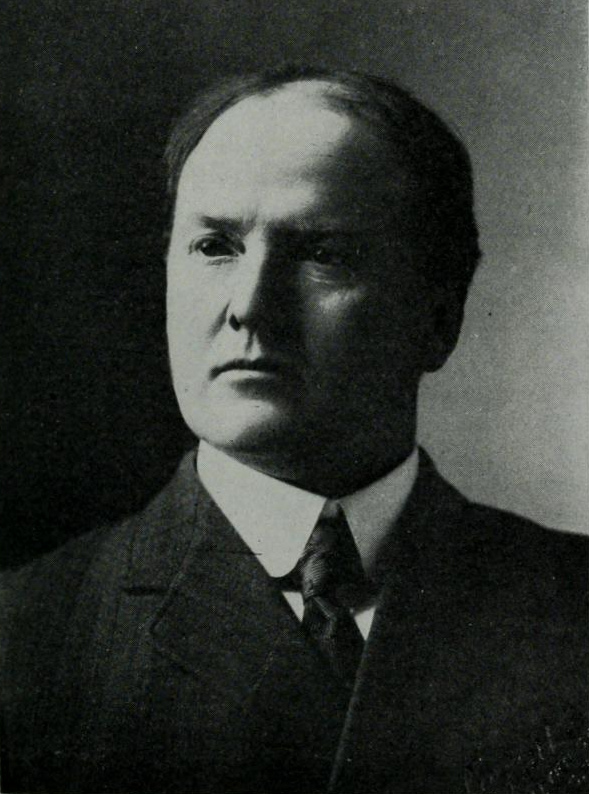

President of the Astronomical Society of the Pacific
- In office 1919–1920
- Preceded by: William Wallace Campbell
- Succeeded by: Joseph Haines Moore

1st Mayor of Berkeley, California
- In office 1909–1911
- Succeeded by: J. Stitt Wilson

Personal details
- Born: Beverly Lacy Hodghead; March 21, 1865 Rockbridge County, Virginia, U.S.
- Died: October 16, 1928 (aged 63) Berkeley, California, U.S.
- Party: Democratic
- Spouse: Nelle Eckles
- Children: 2
- Occupation: Politician, attorney

Beverly Lacy Hodghead (March 21, 1865 – October 16, 1928) was an American politician who served as the first mayor of Berkeley, California, from 1909 to 1911. Although Berkeley had been incorporated since 1878 as a Town, the office of mayor did not exist until the adoption of a new charter that transformed Berkeley into a City.

Hodghead was born in Rockbridge County, Virginia near the town of Lexington and moved to California as a child. He was an attorney, an active Presbyterian throughout his life and very active in public service. He was president of the Astronomical Society of the Pacific in 1919–1920.

He married Nelle Eckles. They had two children.

He died in Berkeley on October 16, 1928. His wife died on December 26, 1945.
