= Samuel Heywood (Berkeley) =

American politician from California

Samuel Heywood (November 16, 1833 – May 9, 1903) was an American politician and prominent early resident of Berkeley, California. He served as the President of the Town Board of Trustees, during 1889 to 1890.

== Biography ==
Samuel Heywood was born on November 16, 1833, in St. Stephen, New Brunswick in Canada. His parents were Zimri Brewer Heywood and Hannah Cooper. The Heywood family came to California in the 1850s, settling on the east shore of San Francisco Bay in an area which became the unincorporated town of Ocean View, and later, West Berkeley. Zimri established a lumber yard at a small pier at what is now the foot of Delaware Street in the 1850s. He joined with the original builder of the pier, sea captain James H. Jacobs, to improve and enlarge it into a full-fledged freight wharf, thenceforth called the Heywood and Jacobs Wharf.

Samuel Heywood married Emma Frances Dingley on May 4, 1874. They had five children: Frank Brewer Heywood (1875–1935), Amy Heywood Oakley (1876–1940), Henrietta Mae Heywood Rose (1879–1910), Gertrude B. Heywood (1880–1927), and Charles Dingley Heywood (1881-1957). His son Charles served as Mayor of the City of Berkeley from 1913 to 1915 and as its Postmaster from 1925 to 1933.

Samuel died in Berkeley on May 9, 1903. His widow died in Berkeley on September 30, 1945.
