= Gus Newport =

American politician (1935–2023)

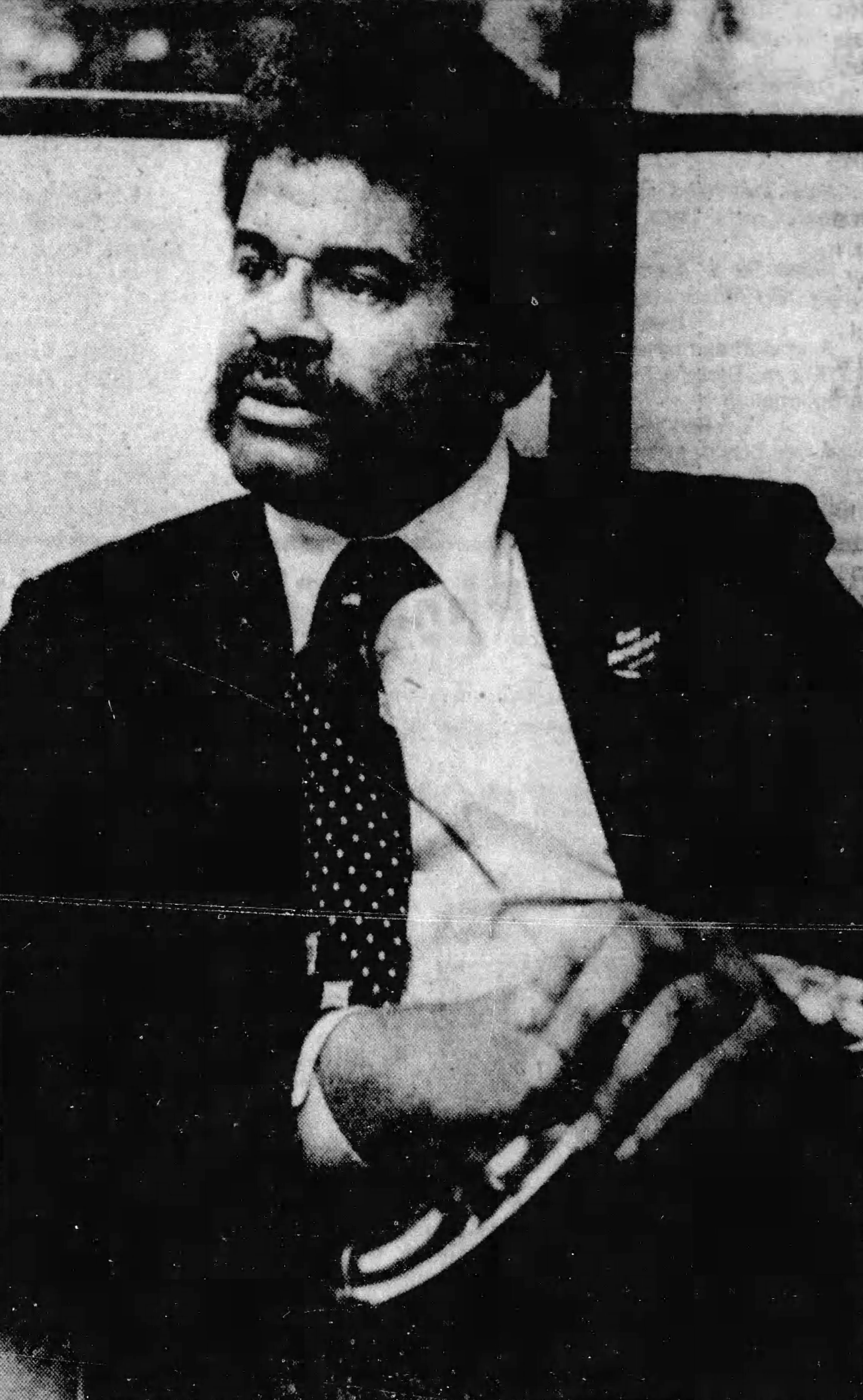
- Newport in 1979

Mayor of Berkeley, California
- In office May 1, 1979 – December 9, 1986
- Preceded by: Warren Widener
- Succeeded by: Loni Hancock

Personal details
- Born: April 5, 1935 Rochester, New York, U.S.
- Died: June 17, 2023 (aged 88) San Francisco, California, U.S.
- Party: Berkeley Citizens Action
- Spouse: Kathryn Ruth Kasch
- Children: Maria; Kyle

Eugene "Gus" Newport (April 5, 1935 – June 17, 2023) was an American politician who served as the mayor of Berkeley, California from 1979 to 1986. He later worked to help the community of Gulfport, Mississippi rebuild in the wake of damage from Hurricane Katrina. He was the second African American mayor of Berkeley.

== Early life ==
Newport was born in Rochester, New York on April 5, 1935. He graduated from Madison High School, attended Heidelberg College, and served in the U.S. Army from 1959 to 1961. Returning to Rochester, he became active in the civil rights movement and was associated with Adam Clayton Powell Jr. and Malcolm X. Disillusioned by Rochester's conservatism, Newport moved to Berkeley, California in 1974.

== Mayoralty ==
Newport was elected mayor in 1979 with the backing of Berkeley Citizens Action, a coalition of progressives, radicals and reformers. The BCA ran on a campaign of economic reform, inspired by a 1976 document, "The Cities’ Wealth: Programs for Community Economic Control in Berkeley, California." He held the mayoralty from 1979 to 1986. As mayor, he banned condominium conversions; allowed the established of a homeless community where residents lived in buses and vans; and declared Berkeley a sanctuary city for El Salvadoran refugees.

== Political views ==
Newport identified as an "avowed socialist" and served as an honorary cochair of the Democratic Socialists of America. He endorsed U.S. Senator Bernie Sanders' campaigns for the Democratic presidential nomination in 2016 and 2020.

== Death ==
Newport died at the San Francisco General Hospital on June 17, 2023, at the age of 88. He was survived by a wife, Kathryn Ruth Kasch, and two children, Maria and Kyle.

== See also ==
- List of Democratic Socialists of America who have held office in the United States
