= Wilmont Sweeney =

American judge

California Superior Court Judge
- In office 1979–1996
- Appointed by: Jerry Brown Jr.

Personal details
- Born: November 19, 1925; Austin, TX, U.S.
- Died: April 24, 1999 (aged 73); Berkeley, CA
- Political party: Democratic
- Spouse: Linetta McCarter (divorced)
- Children: 2
- Education: University of California, Berkeley (BA); UC Hastings College of Law (Law degree)

Wilmont Sweeney (November 19, 1925 - April 24, 1999) was an American attorney, judge and politician - the first black member of Berkeley's city council.

Sweeney was born in Austin, Texas on November 19, 1925. After serving in the Army during World War II, he graduated from the University of California, Berkeley with a degree in political science in 1950, from UC Hastings College of Law in 1955, and was elected to the City Council of Berkeley, California in 1961. He was Berkeley's first black council member. In 1974 he was inducted as the first black judge in Berkeley-Albany Municipal Court; in 1979 he was appointed a Superior Court judge by California Governor Jerry Brown. He lived at 1610 Stannage Avenue, Berkeley for many years, listing the address on ballots for his re-election to Superior Court judge.

As Superior Court juvenile court judge, Sweeney promoted counseling and rehabilitation as alternatives to detention centers. California's juvenile court judges bestow an award in Sweeney's name honoring judges who uphold this ideal. In Alameda County, a minimum security residential program for males age 15 to 19 is named to honor Wilmont Sweeney.

Sweeney was noted for his sense of humor and proportion, and was well respected as a council member. He once said:

When I grew up in Texas, I came to find out early in life, that, when you're dealing with the bad guys, you've always got to remember that it's not enough that you win the game, and win it fairly and squarely, you've still got to win the fight afterwards out in the parking lot.
