= Wallace J. S. Johnson =

American politician (1913–1979)

15th Mayor of Berkeley, California
- In office 1963–1971
- Preceded by: Claude B. Hutchison
- Succeeded by: Warren Widener

Personal details
- Born: January 29, 1913 Fort Dodge, Iowa, U.S.
- Died: August 12, 1979 (aged 66) Berkeley, California, U.S.
- Party: Republican
- Occupation: Politician

Wallace J. S. Johnson (January 29, 1913 – August 12, 1979) was an American politician who served as the 15th mayor of Berkeley, California. A moderate Republican and the last of his party to hold the office, he served two terms from 1963 to 1971 during the most politically turbulent time in Berkeley's history. Johnson was an engineer by training, a graduate of Caltech. He held several patents.

== Biography ==
Johnson was born in Fort Dodge, Iowa, on January 29, 1913. In 1947, he founded Up-Right, Inc., a scaffolding company in Berkeley. He was Mayor of Berkeley, California as a moderate Republican from 1963 to 1971. Besides presiding over the often tumultuous city council meetings of the 1960s, one of his most notable achievements was leading the effort to have the tracks of the proposed BART line through Berkeley constructed underground instead of elevated as had been the original plan. 83% of Berkeley voters voted to increase local taxes to have the tracks underground.

He died on August 12, 1979, in Berkeley, aged 66.

== Books authored ==
- The Uncommon Man in American Business (1966), OCLC 835874378
- Responsible Individualism: Perspectives on a Political Philosophy for Our Time (1967), OCLC 885789
- A Fresh Look at Patriotism (1976), OCLC 680940449
