= California State Relief Administration =

California State Relief Administration (SRA)
Agency overview
- Formed: April 19, 1935
- Preceding agency: State Emergency Relief Administration (SERA)
- Dissolved: June 20, 1941

The California State Relief Administration (SRA) was a government agency responsible for administering unemployment relief and distributing state and federal funds to improve conditions in California during the Great Depression. It was established in 1935 as the successor to the State Emergency Relief Administration (SERA), established in 1933. The SRA was effectively abolished in 1941 when the State Legislature refused to grant it further appropriations at the state level.

== Leadership ==
List of administrators of the SERA
No.	Portrait	Name	Term of office			Governor(s)	Ref.
No.	Portrait	Name	Took office	Left office	Time in office	Governor(s)	Ref.
1	R. C. Branion	R. C. Branion	March 24, 1933	November 30, 1934 (Note: On leave since July 20, 1934.)	1 year, 251 days	James Rolph; Frank Merriam	
2	Vernon D. Northrop	Vernon D. Northrop	November 30, 1934 (Note: Acting administrator since July 20, 1934.)	January 8, 1935	39 days	Frank Merriam	
3	Roy W. Pilling	Roy W. Pilling	January 8, 1935	February 6, 1935	29 days	Frank Merriam	
4	Frank Y. McLaughlin	Frank Y. McLaughlin	February 6, 1935	April 19, 1935	72 days	Frank Merriam	

== Gallery ==
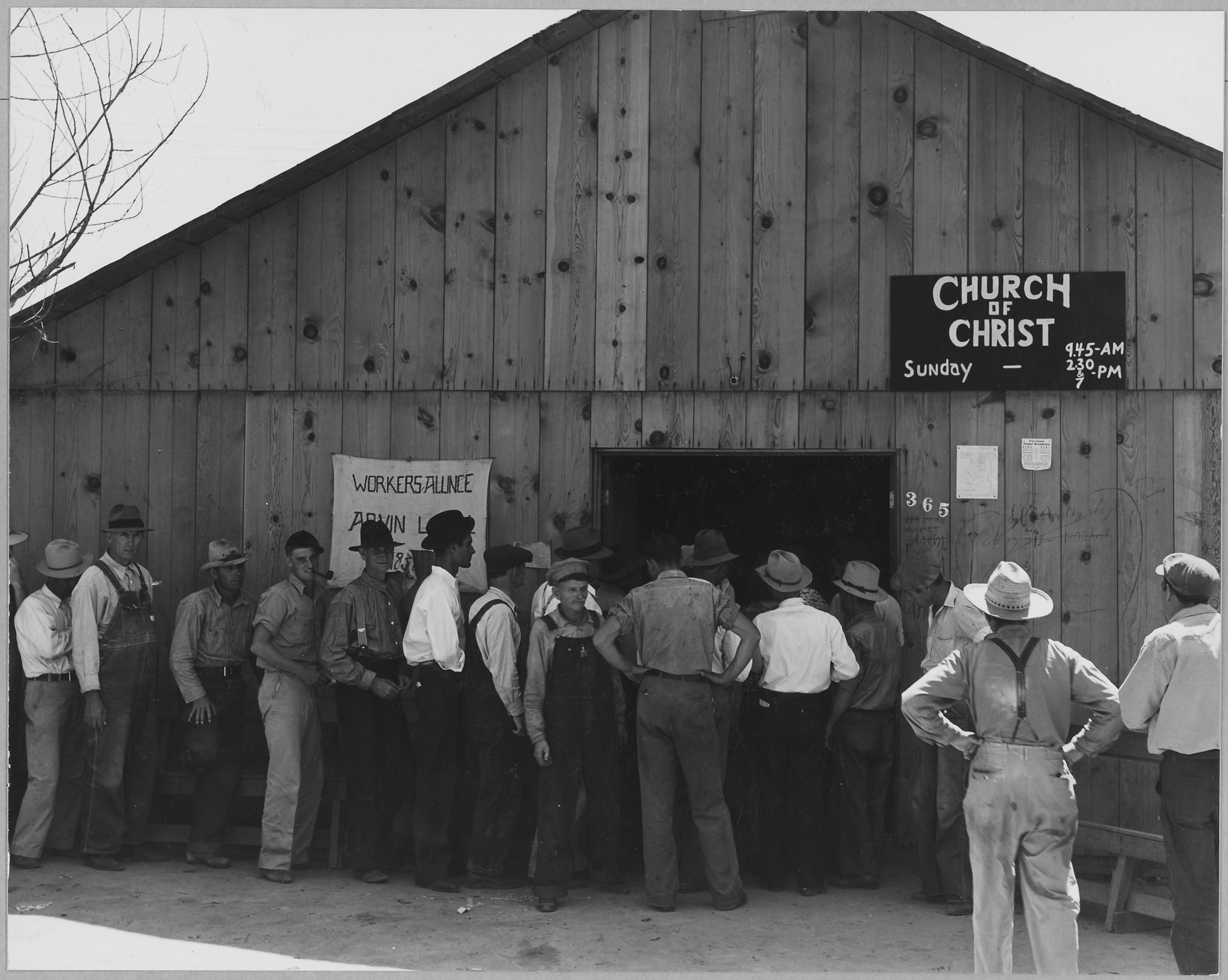
Line up for state relief pay day, Arvin, California, 1940

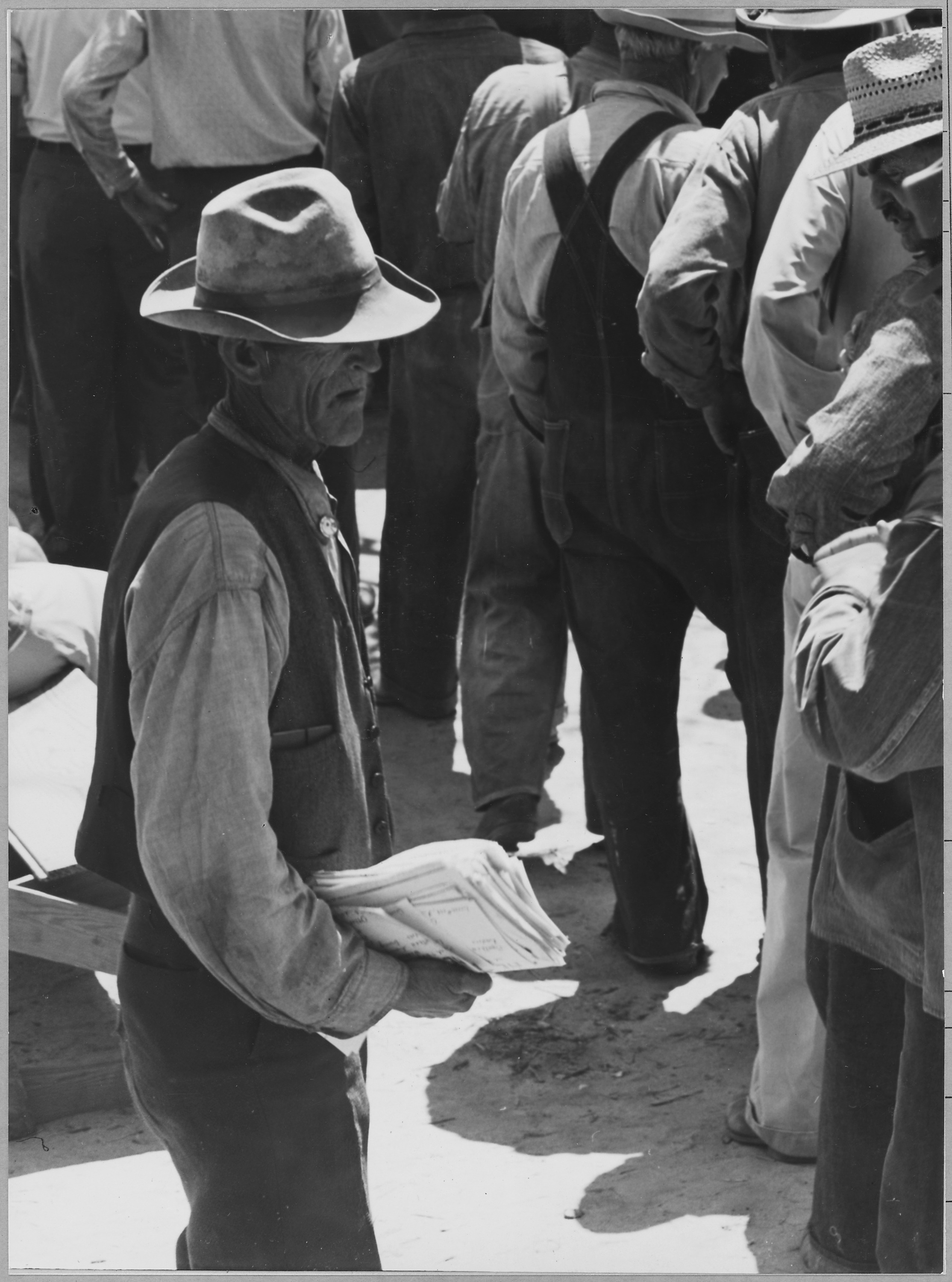
Close-up of relief queue on S.R.A. pay day, Arvin, California, 1940

== See also ==
- Works Progress Administration
- Federal Emergency Relief Administration
