= Frank S. Gaines =

American politician

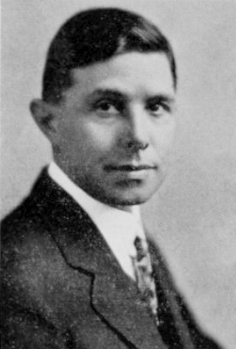

Mayor of Berkeley, California
- In office 1939–1943

Personal details
- Born: Frank Stewart Gaines; March 6, 1890 Biggs, California, US
- Died: March 3, 1977 (aged 86) Sacramento, California, US
- Spouse: Louise Moore (m. 1923)
- Children: 3

Frank Stewart Gaines (1890–1977) was the Mayor of Berkeley, California from 1939 to 1943.

== Biography ==
Frank S. Gaines was born March 6, 1890, in Biggs, California. His mother was Nettie Stewart Gaines who came to California in 1883. His father was Francis Albert Gaines. His mother wrote a book published in 1910, The Pathway of Western Literature, which was used in many California Public Schools. Mayor Gaines' brother Clarence was connected with the Redding office of the Pacific Gas and Electric Company. His uncle Edward C. Stewart was president of the Union Safe Deposit Bank in Stockton, California.

Gaines married his wife Louise on September 15, 1923; they had three children. Their oldest son, William Stewart Gaines, could claim to be a British subject when he reached his 18th birthday because he was born in London in 1924.

Gaines was noted for his involvement in the Berkeley-based Pacific Coast Committee on American Principles and Fair Play, a group which addressed the plight of Japanese Americans during World War II. The group's honorary chairman was Robert Gordon Sproul, president of the University of California.

He died March 3, 1977, in Sacramento. He was buried in Biggs.
