= Laurance L. Cross =

American politician

Laurance L. Cross (April 13, 1892–August 27, 1966) was a Presbyterian minister and Mayor of Berkeley, California from 1947 to 1955.

Cross was born in Gastonburg, Alabama. His father and two brothers were also pastors. One of his nephews is Frank M. Cross of Harvard Divinity School, a member of the team which interpreted the Dead Sea Scrolls.

From 1924 to his death in 1966, Cross headed the Northbrae Community Church located on The Alameda between Los Angeles and Solano Avenues.

As Mayor, Cross was noted for his solid support of civil rights. On May 23, 1952, for example, he spoke out on behalf of Paul Robeson's right to appear on Bay Area stages, a position which put him at odds with San Francisco Mayor Elmer Robinson.

In 1954, he was suggested as a Democratic candidate for Governor of California, but narrowly lost the nomination to Richard Graves at the state party convention.

Cross married Erma Gilbert in 1920. They had six children.

He died in 1966 and was interred in his family's burial plot in Birmingham, Alabama. His wife died at the age of 99 on April 22, 1990.
