= Silas H. Stringham =

American Navy admiral (1798–1876)

Silas Horton Stringham
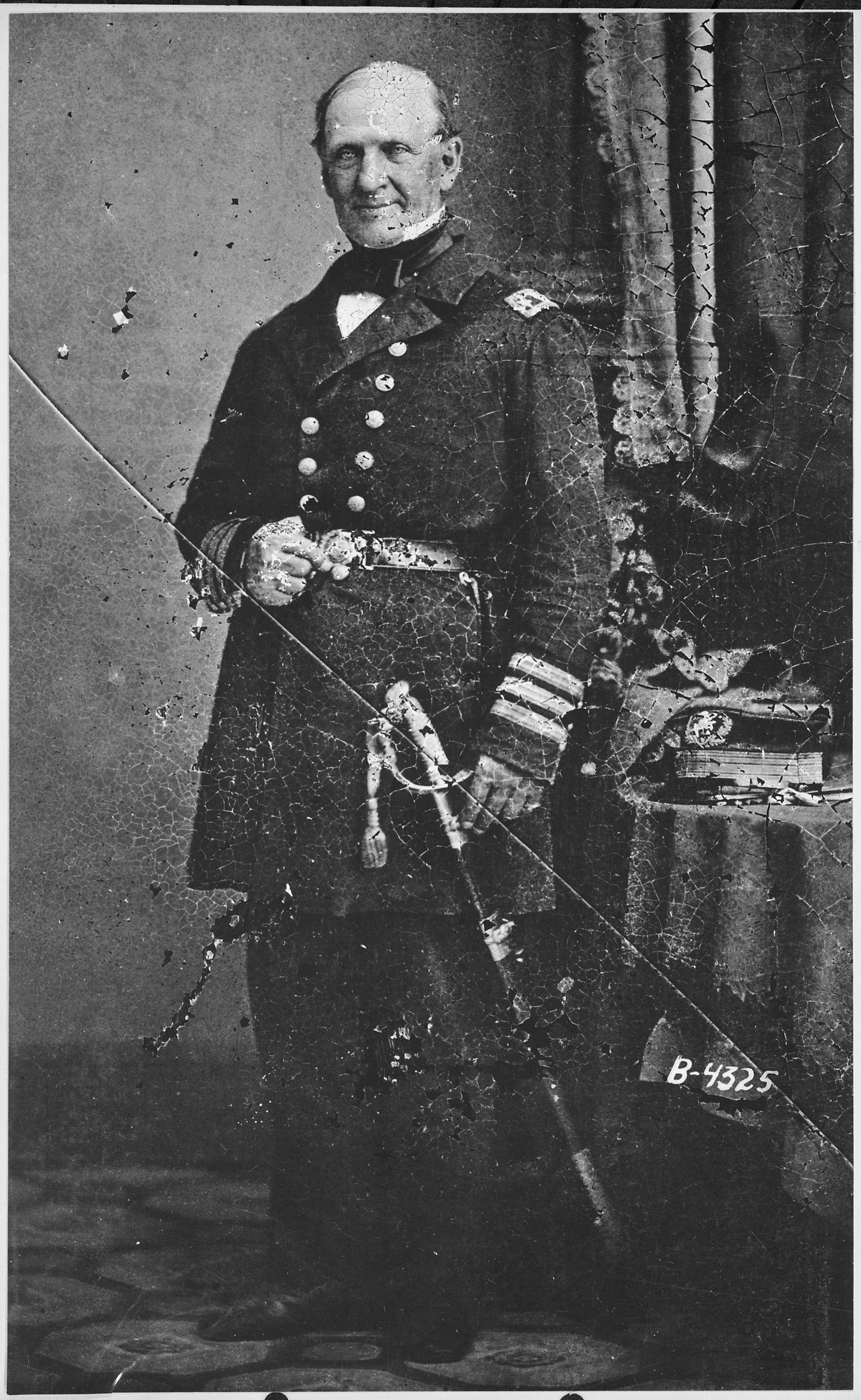
- Admiral Silas H. Stringham
- Born: November 7, 1798; Middletown, New York, US
- Died: February 7, 1876 (aged 77); Brooklyn, New York, US
- Military career
- Allegiance: United States
- Branch: United States Navy
- Service years: 1809–1861
- Rank: Rear admiral
- Commands: USS John Adams; USS Independence; USS Ohio; Brazil Squadron; Mediterranean Squadron; Atlantic Blockading Squadron
- Conflicts: War of 1812; Second Barbary War; Mexican–American War; American Civil War

Silas Horton Stringham (November 7, 1798 – February 7, 1876) was an officer of the United States Navy who saw active service during the War of 1812, the Second Barbary War, and the Mexican–American War, and who commanded the Atlantic Blockading Squadron at the beginning of the American Civil War.

== Early life ==
Born in Middletown, New York, Stringham entered the Navy on November 15, 1809, aged only 11 years old, receiving promotion to the rank of midshipman on June 19, 1810 while serving under Captain John Rodgers in the frigate President. He was present during the Little Belt affair in May 1811, and during the engagement with HMS Belvidera on June 23, 1812.

== Early career ==
Having received his commission as a lieutenant on December 9, 1814, he was assigned to the brig Spark, Captain Thomas Gamble, which was part of Stephen Decatur's squadron in the Barbary Wars, and helped to take an Algerine frigate. In early 1816, while Spark was at Gibraltar, a French brig, attempting to enter the bay in a heavy gale, capsized. Stringham and six seamen in a small boat, pulled over to the brig, and rescued five of the crew. He attempted to return to Spark, but could make no headway, so turned and pulled for the Algerian shore, but was wrecked in the heavy surf, with one of his crew and two of the Frenchmen drowned.

In 1819 Stringham was serving aboard the Cyane, conveying black settlers to Liberia. While Cyane was off the African coast. Captain Edward Trenchard gave Stringham command of a boat in the capturing of four slavers. Trenchard then appointed Stingham prize-master and sent him home with them. In 1821 Stringham was appointed first lieutenant of the brig Hornet in the West Indies Squadron, and from 1825 to 1829 served at the Brooklyn Navy Yard. In late 1829 he was appointed First Lieutenant of the Peacock to take part in the search for his former ship Hornet, believed lost. During the search he was transferred to the sloop Falmouth, and sent to Cartagena, finally returning to New York in 1830.

Stringham was promoted to commander on March 3, 1831, and for the next five years was engaged on shore duty. In 1836-37 he served in the Mediterranean Squadron commanding the John Adams, then returned to the Brooklyn Navy Yard. Receiving promotion to captain in 1841, he commanded the razee Independence in the Home Squadron in 1843, then returned to the Brooklyn Navy Yard, serving as commandant in 1845–46.

== Mexican-American War ==
In late 1846 he was placed in command of the ship of the line Ohio, and during the Mexican–American War took part in the bombardment of Vera Cruz as it was besieged by troops under General Winfield Scott. For a short time afterwards he commanded the Brazil Squadron, but in 1851 took charge of the Gosport Navy Yard. Between 1852 and 1855 he commanded the Mediterranean Squadron, his flagship being the frigate Cumberland. He then returned to Gosport, where he remained till 1859.

== American Civil War ==
In March and April, 1861, Stringham was Chief, Organization Office, U.S. Navy. He took command of the USS Minnesota in April 1861. He was Flag officer of the Atlantic Blockading Squadron from June 8, 1861 to September 18, 1861. In August he was sent with troops under General Benjamin F. Butler, to capture two coastal forts near Cape Hatteras. In the ensuing battle, the fortifications were captured without loss, though not without some difficulty owing to the weather, and the fleet returned to Fort Monroe to general acclaim.

Soon after the return of the Battle of Hatteras Inlet Batteries, acclaim for Strigham's performance gave way to criticism of Stringham for not taking his ships closer in, and continuing to attack along the coast. The fact that his ships drew too much water to enter the shallow coastal waters, and that he had been directly ordered to return immediately, eventually emerged, but apparently too late to soothe his irritation, as the next month, at his own request, he was relieved of his command. He was placed on the retired list on December 21, 1861.

Strigham served as Chairman of the Board to Examine the Robert I. Stevens Battery I, from November 1, 1861 to December 24, 1861.

As some small compensation on August 1, 1862 he was promoted to the rank of rear admiral on the retired list to rank from July 16, 1862.

Strigham served as Chairman of the Navy Yard Site Selection Board from August 12, 1862 to October 24, 1862.

On February 7, 1863, Stringham received the Thanks of Congress, presented "to Rear Admiral Silas H. Stringham, now on the retired list, for distinguished services in the capture of Forts Hatteras and Clark".

Though no longer on active duty, Stringham served as commandant of the Boston Navy Yard, 1864–66, and as port admiral of New York in 1870.

== Later life ==
Stringham died in Brooklyn, New York. He was buried at Green Wood Cemetery, Brooklyn, New York.

== Legacy ==
Two Navy ships have been named USS Stringham in his honor.
