= Virginia Myers =

American dancer (1906–1975)

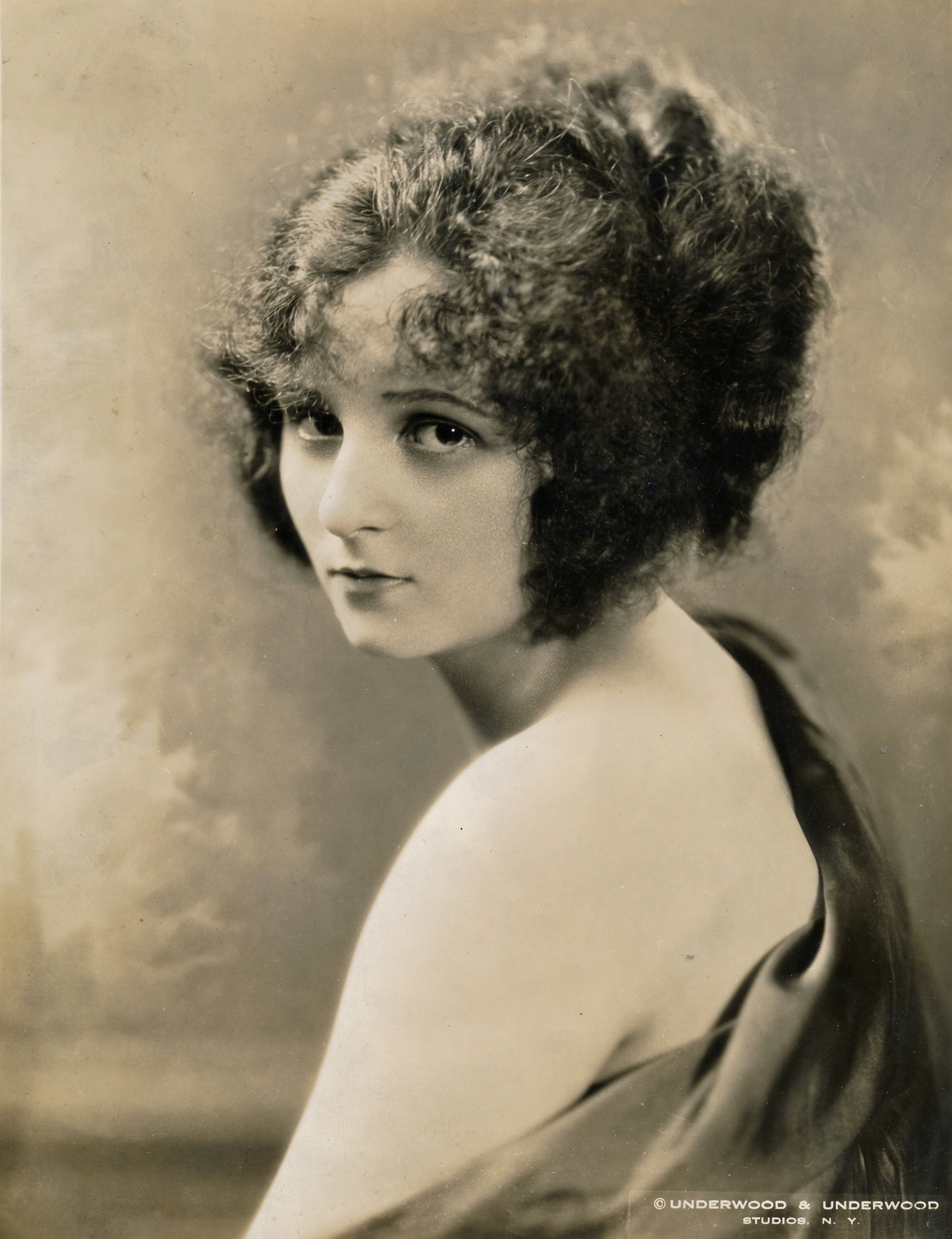
- Myers in 1926
- Born: October 21, 1906; New York, New York
- Died: January 4, 1975 (aged 68); New York, New York
- Known for: Modern / Improvisational Dance

Virginia Myers (October 21, 1906 - January 4, 1975) was an American dancer who gained national recognition as a precocious talent during her childhood in New York in the 1910s and 1920s.

== Biography ==
Born in New York City in 1906, her parents were the New York-based artists Jerome Myers and Ethel Myers. Virginia Myers was first introduced to the New York public at the age of four when she performed her own solo improvisational dance to the "Morning Mood" section of Grieg's Peer Gynt suite. It formed the 4-minute Prologue to a full evening of music, dance and story for a charity Benefit staged at the Plaza Hotel in Manhattan on April 4, 1911.

Additional critical exposure and publicity was generated from the decision by the Edison Film Company to star Myers, then only 5 years old, in their 1000th film release, as the first part of a split reeler. This 20-minute film, solely devoted to her original creative dancing, was titled Dream Dances of Virginia Myers (1912) and produced by the Edison Film Company as production #1000, which was distributed all over America as well as overseas.

In the 11 years to follow, Virginia made fifteen dance appearances at various New York theaters, each time filling an entire afternoon or evening program with her own original dance interpretations of a wide range of musical works. Without formal dance training, professional choreography, or staging, she became a famous dancer in America and around the world during that era.

== A chronology of newspaper and other clippings ==
- Virginia Myers’ art is a perfect creative product. (Ruth St. Denis, 1911)
- 'Virginia Myers at the age of five years is a great artist.' ... 'It leaves one feeling that here has been seen not a little dancing child, but the fleeting soul of a great artist–a mist of transcending genius, that vanishes even as it is viewed, but which remains.' (The Morning Telegraph, 1912)
- 'Elsewhere in Art, Literature and Dramatic circles she' [Virginia Myers] 'is called a great tragedienne and compared to Elanora Duse and the "Divine Sarah." The fact is that Virginia has upset all calculations.' (New York American, 1912)
- 'I realized that this one little girl was the only child I knew of in the world who was doing this spontaneously beautiful thing.' (The Craftsman 1912)
- 'Little Virginia Myers, six-year-old daughter of Mr. and Mrs. Jerome Myers, has stirred in me again that disturbing sense of beauty which is the essence of life. She is an exquisite dancer.' (Hutchins Hapgood, The New York Globe, ca.1912)
- 'Virginia Myers is extraordinary.' (New York Press, ca.1913)
- 'She' [Virginia Myers] 'has created her own dances, her poses and her interpretations; no one knows quite how her mood will catch the rhythm of the music and become one with the soul of the musician who inspires her.' (New York Evening Sun, January 4, 1913)
- 'Virginia Myers is a child of the century. Already at the age of six, she is a dancer of note.' (Vogue, 1913)
- 'She is transformed into the living expression in motion of the spirit of the music she hears.' (Washington Times, December 12, 1913)
- 'Among the myriad dancers—both professional and amateur—in New York to-day, perhaps the most picturesque and spontaneous is Virginia Myers. (Vanity Fair, 1915)
- 'She' [Virginia Myers] 'is a finished creative artist.' (New York Review, 1915)
- 'Virginia Myers ... is considered by people who know as one of the greatest emotional dancers of the time.' (Various, 1915)
- 'Her work is pronounced by critics to be remarkable for one of her years.' (The Sun, June 11, 1916)
- 'Virginia is a dancer of unusual ability. The technique of her dancing has astonished the critics. (The Sun, September 17, 1916)
- 'With great charm and grace and freedom from self-consciousness Virginia Myers, the sixteen-year-old interpretive dancer, daughter of the well-known artist and painter of east side life, Jerome Myers, made her public debut last night at Carnegie Hall with an excellent house and enthusiastic applause.' (New York Times, April 3, 1923)
- Virginia Myers, an accomplished young American dancer, held the attention of her audience by versatile interpretations throughout an entire evening at Carnegie Hall. (New York Times, April 3, 1923)
