= Horace Davis =

American politician (1831–1916)

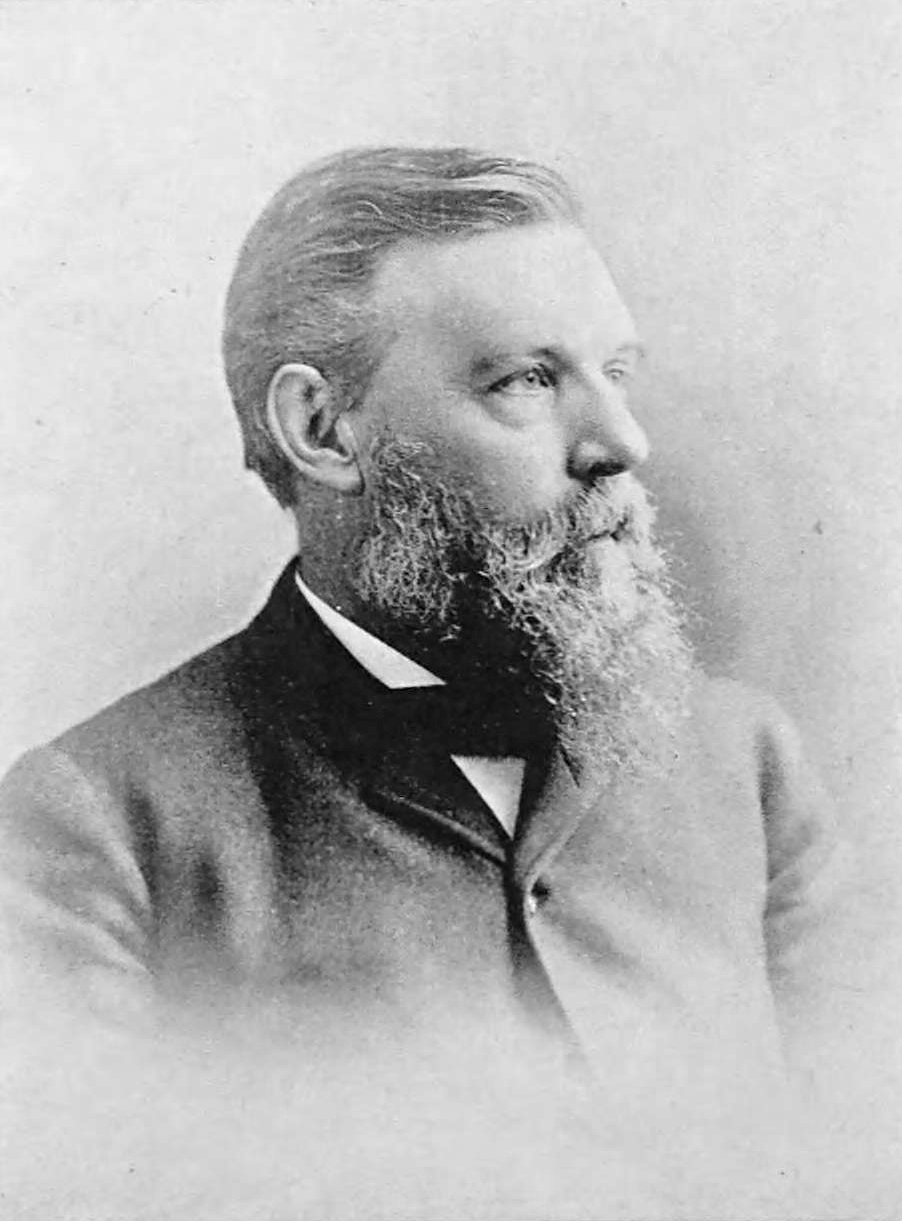
- Davis c. 1895

Member of the U.S. House of Representatives from California's 1st district
- In office March 4, 1877 – March 3, 1881
- Preceded by: William Adam Piper
- Succeeded by: William Rosecrans

6th President of the University of California
- In office February, 1888 – April 1890
- Preceded by: Edward S. Holden
- Succeeded by: Martin Kellogg

Personal details
- Born: March 16, 1831 Worcester, Massachusetts, United States
- Died: July 12, 1916 (aged 85) San Francisco, California, United States
- Resting place: Cypress Lawn Memorial Park
- Party: Republican
- Parent(s): John Davis and Eliza Bancroft Davis
- Relatives: see Davis political family

Horace Davis (March 16, 1831 – July 12, 1916) was an American businessman who served two terms as a United States representative from California from 1877 to 1881. He later served as president of the University of California from 1887 to 1890.

He was the son of Massachusetts Governor John Davis and the younger brother of diplomat John Chandler Bancroft Davis.

== Biography ==
Davis was born in Worcester, Massachusetts. He attended the Worcester public schools and Williams College, Williamstown, Massachusetts, graduated from Harvard University in 1849, and then studied law in the Dane Law School of Harvard University, but did not engage in professional pursuits by reason of failing eyesight.

=== Business career ===
Davis sailed for San Francisco, California, around Cape Horn in 1852, and upon arriving, engaged for a brief time as a gold miner, a lumber supercargo surveyor for a coastal steamer, and a purser for the Pacific Mail Steamship Company. In addition he helped found the Mercantile Library Association of California (its oldest public library). Under his administrative tutelage interest in the library was restored with his creation of a library catalog (an act which later led to his poor eyesight). He resigned in 1855 and relocated to San Francisco in 1860 at which time he established the highly successful Golden Gate Flouring Mills and the Sperry Flour Company. He was elected a member of the American Antiquarian Society in 1862.

When the American Civil War broke out, he served in the secretive San Francisco-based Home Guard acting to secure both the loyalty of California to then Union President Abraham Lincoln and the election of Leland Stanford as governor of California (by patrolling the polls on election day).

=== Congress ===
He presided over the Produce Exchange of San Francisco from 1867 to 1877 until he was elected as a Republican to the United States House of Representatives of the Forty-fifth and Forty-sixth Congresses (March 4, 1877 - March 3, 1881), where on June 8, 1878, he spoke in support of a bill to restrict Chinese immigration. He was an unsuccessful candidate for reelection in 1880 to the Forty-seventh Congress.

=== Later career ===
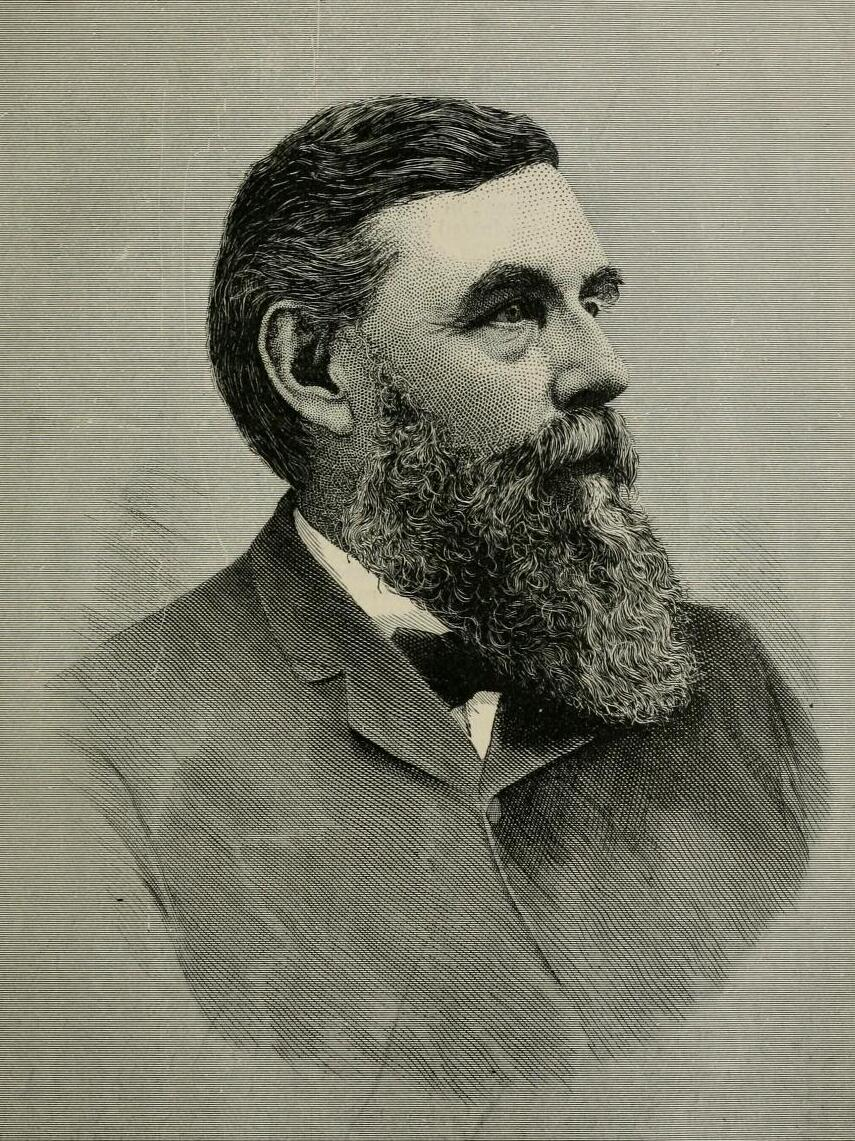
Engraving by Moss, 1889

After his retirement from the Produce Exchange of San Francisco he presided over both the San Francisco Chamber of Commerce 1883–1884 and the Savings and Loan Society 1885 and served as a member of the Republican National Committee 1880–1888.

In February, 1888 he was elected president of the University of California, but resigned in April, 1890. He was named president of the board of trustees of Stanford University by its original founder and served in this capacity from 1885 to 1916 where he effected its consolidation with the Wilmerding and Lux schools.

He served as president of the University of California from 1887 to 1890.

Davis ran for Mayor of San Francisco in 1899, but lost to incumbent James D. Phelan.

== Personal life ==
Married twice and a devout Unitarian, he contributed greatly to Starr King School for the Ministry, (formerly the Pacific Unitarian School for the Ministry). He was an active student of history and literature, his most noted work being an essay entitled American Constitutions.

== Death and burial ==
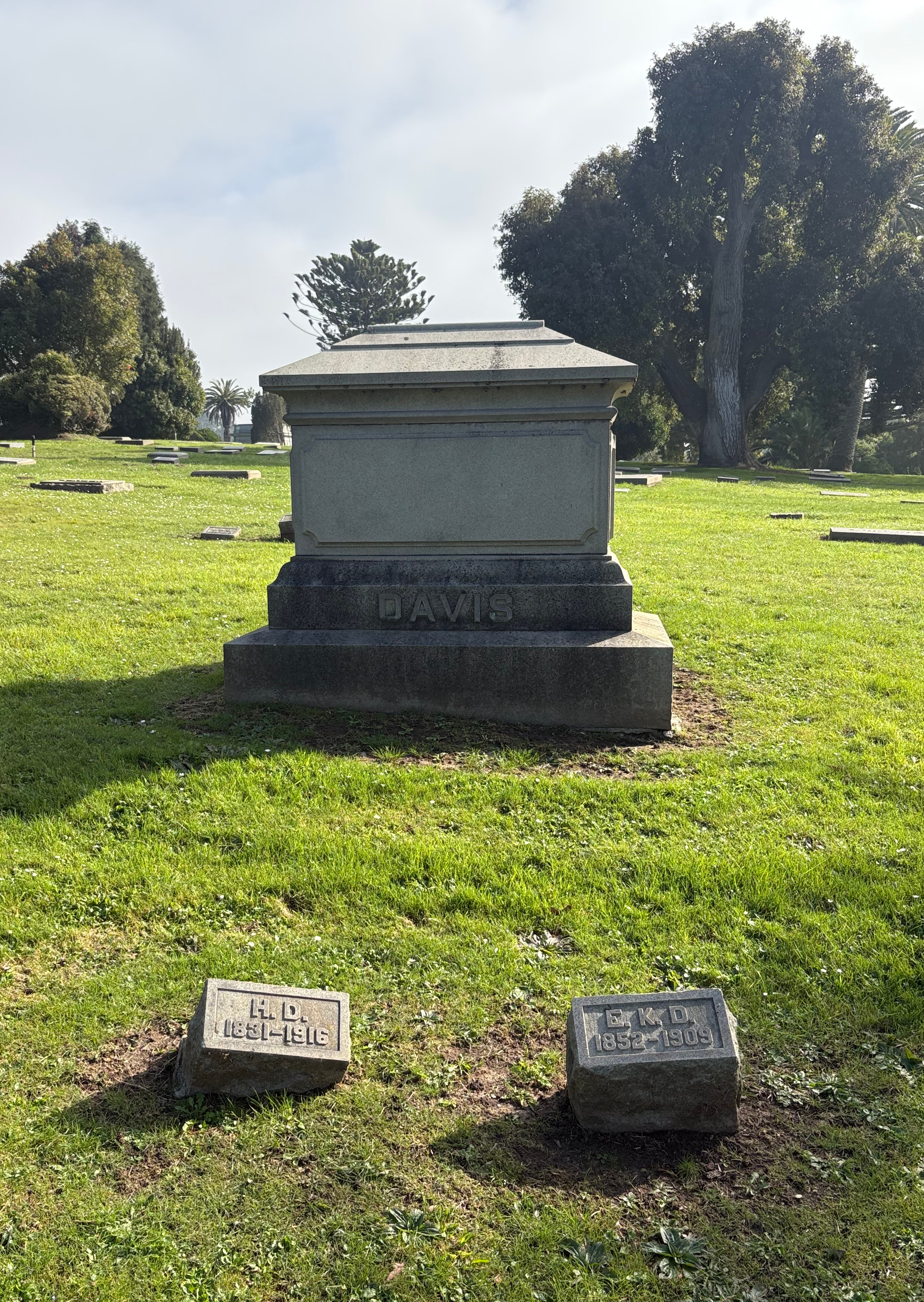
Davis's grave at Cypress Lawn Memorial Park

Davis died after an appendicitis operation in San Francisco in 1916 and was buried in Cypress Lawn Cemetery (now Cypress Lawn Memorial Park) in Colma, California.

== Electoral ==
1876 United States House of Representatives elections
Party	Candidate	Votes	%
Republican	Horace Davis	22,134	53.3
Democratic	William Adam Piper (Incumbent)	19,363	46.7
Total votes		41,497	100.0
Republican gain from Democratic			

1878 United States House of Representatives elections
Party	Candidate	Votes	%
Republican	Horace Davis (Incumbent)	20,074	48.4
Independent	Clitus Barbour	18,449	44.5
Democratic	Charles R. Summer	2,940	7.1
Total votes		41,463	100.0
Republican hold			

1880 United States House of Representatives elections
Party	Candidate	Votes	%
Democratic	William Rosecrans	21,005	51.0
Republican	Horace Davis (Incumbent)	19,496	47.3
Greenback	Stephen Maybell	683	1.7
Total votes		41,184	100.0
Democratic gain from Republican			

== See also ==
- Davis political family

Academic offices
Preceded by Edward S. Holden	President of the University of California; 1880–1890	Succeeded by Martin Kellogg
U.S. House of Representatives
Preceded by William Adam Piper	Member of the U.S. House of Representatives from California's 1st congressional district 1877–1881	Succeeded by William S. Rosecrans
