= William Adam Piper =

American politician

William A. Piper
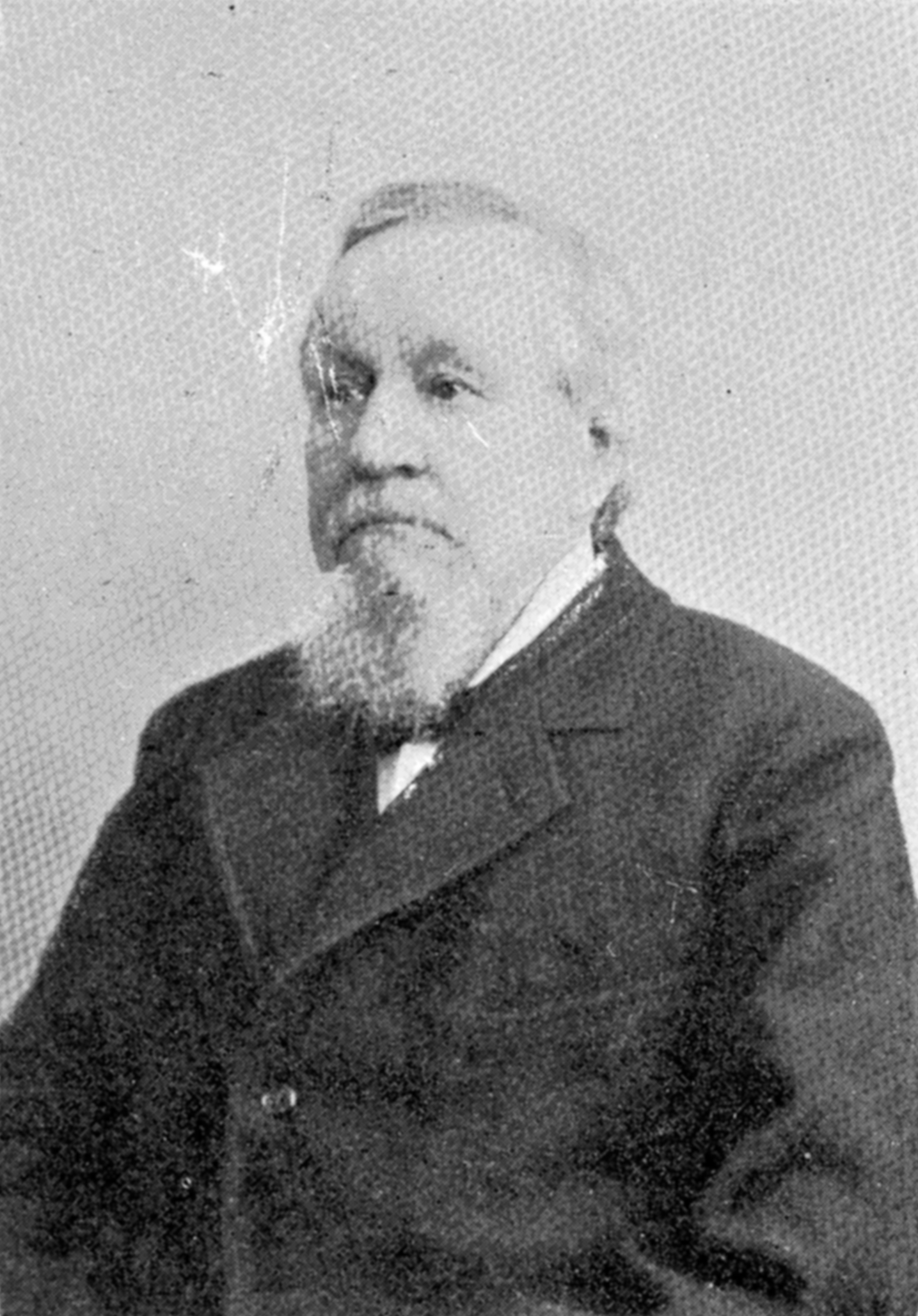
- Piper c. 1895

Member of the U.S. House of Representatives from California's 1st district
- In office March 4, 1875 – March 3, 1877
- Preceded by: Charles Clayton
- Succeeded by: Horace Davis

Personal details
- Born: May 21, 1826 Franklin County, Pennsylvania, U.S.
- Died: August 5, 1899 (aged 73) San Francisco, California, U.S.
- Resting place: Greenlawn Memorial Park, Colma, California, U.S.
- Party: Democratic

William Adam Piper (May 21, 1826, Pennsylvania – August 5, 1899, San Francisco) was an American politician and a businessperson. He was a one-term member of the United States House of Representatives from California from 1875 to 1877.

== Biography ==
William Adam Piper was born on May 21, 1826, in Franklin County, Pennsylvania. He attended the common schools and later moved to St. Louis, Missouri. During the Mexican–American War, he served in Company A, Eighth Missouri Light Artillery, from June 8, 1846, to June 24, 1847. He moved to California in 1848 and settled in San Francisco in 1849, where he engaged in mercantile pursuits.

=== Congress ===
William Adam Piper was elected as a Democrat to the 44th United States Congress. He received only 49.06% of the vote, the opposition being divided between Iva P. Rankin running as a Republican and the independent candidate John F. Swift. Piper served from March 4, 1875, until March 3, 1877. In 1876, he was an unsuccessful candidate for re-election to the 45th United States Congress.

=== Later career and death ===
He continued his business activities, and he died on August 5, 1899, in San Francisco, California.

He was interred in Odd Fellows Cemetery in San Francisco, California and re-interred at Greenlawn Memorial Park in Colma, California.

== Electoral history ==
1872 United States House of Representatives elections
Party	Candidate	Votes	%
Republican	Charles Clayton	11,938	52.3
Democratic	William Adam Piper	10,883	47.7
Total votes		22,821	100.0
Republican win (new seat)			

1874 United States House of Representatives elections
Party	Candidate	Votes	%
Democratic	William Adam Piper	12,417	49.1
Republican	Ira P. Rankin	6,791	26.8
Independent	John F. Swift	6,103	24.1
Total votes		25,311	100.0
Democratic gain from Republican			

1876 United States House of Representatives elections
Party	Candidate	Votes	%
Republican	Horace Davis	22,134	53.3
Democratic	William Adam Piper (Incumbent)	19,363	46.7
Total votes		41,497	100.0
Republican gain from Democratic			

U.S. House of Representatives
Preceded by Charles Clayton	Member of the U.S. House of Representatives from California's 1st congressional district 1875–1877	Succeeded by Horace Davis
