= Martin Kellogg =

American educator, academic administrator (1828–1903)

7th President of the University of California
- In office 1893–1899
- Succeeded by: Benjamin Ide Wheeler

Acting President of the University of California
- In office 1890–1893

Personal details
- Born: Martin Kellogg; March 15, 1828 Vernon, Connecticut, United States
- Died: August 26, 1903 (aged 75) San Francisco, California, United States
- Education: Yale University (BA)
- Occupation: Educator, theologist, academic administrator

Martin Kellogg (March 15, 1828 – August 26, 1903) was an American theologist, educator, and academic administrator. He was the 7th President of the University of California.

== Early life and education ==
He was born on March 15, 1828, in Vernon, Connecticut, to Eliza Kellogg (née White) and Allyn Kellogg.

He graduated from Yale University as valedictorian of the class of 1850.

== Career ==
Kellogg was ordained as a missionary in the Congregational Church and served as a pastor in Shasta, California, in 1855. This was then followed by pastorship in Grass Valley, California, from 1857 to 1860; and then in Oakland, California, starting in 1861.

Kellogg joined the faculty of the College of California and was the only faculty member to make the transition to the new state university when the College's trustees decided to donate its assets to the state government to form the University of California. He became the first member of the Academic Senate of the University of California on September 1, 1868. He served as acting president from 1890 to 1893, then served as the seventh President of the University of California from 1893 to 1899.

He served on the Board of Education in Berkeley and twice as Moderator of the General Association of California.

He served as a trustee of the First Congregational Church of Berkeley.

Kellogg died on August 26, 1903, at Waldeck Sanatorium in San Francisco. He was preceded in death by his adopted daughter, Annie Day Kellogg, who committed suicide earlier that year on April 25, 1903.

Academic offices
Preceded by Horace Davis	President of the University of California; 1893–1899	Succeeded by Benjamin Ide Wheeler
