= 1899 San Francisco mayoral election =

- November 7, 1899
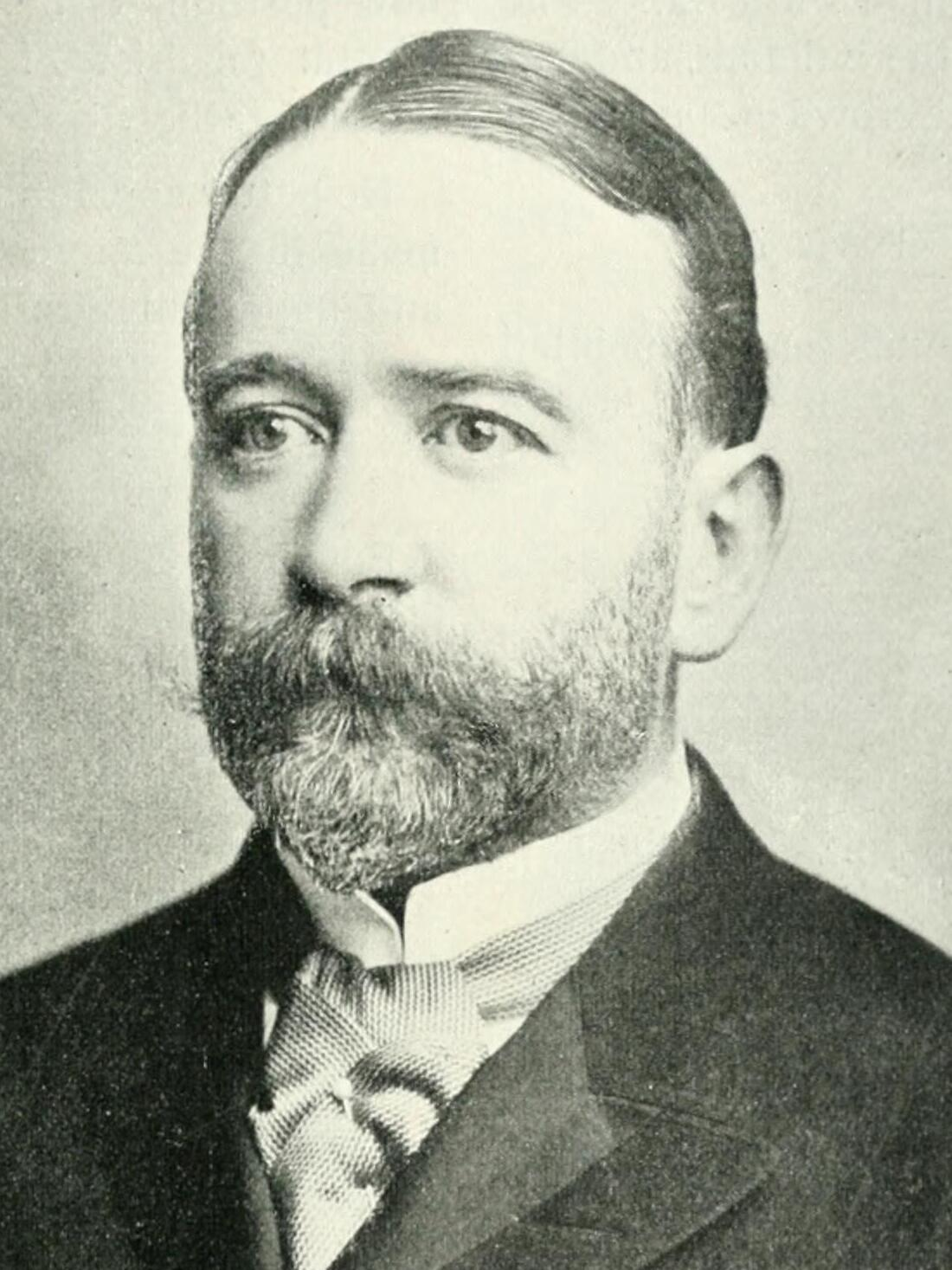

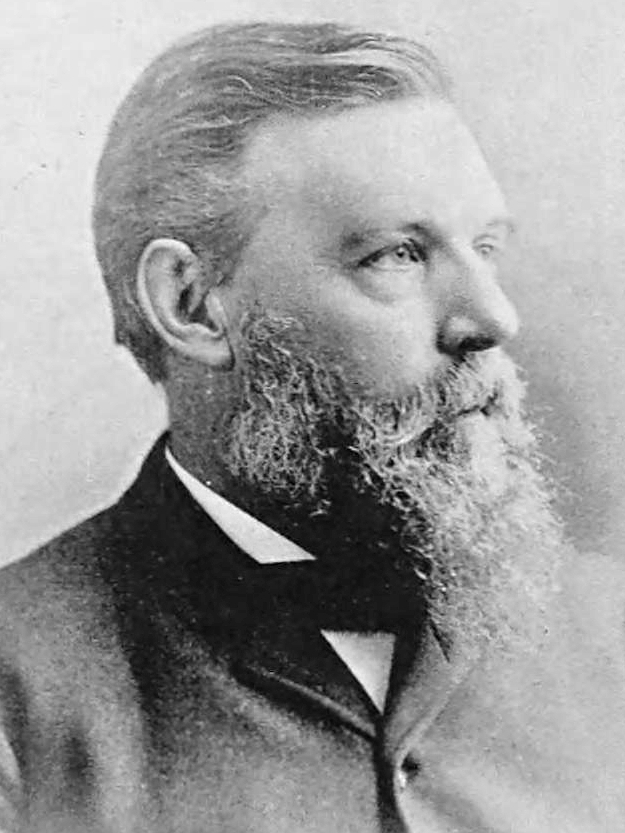
| Candidate | James D. Phelan | Horace Davis |
| Party | Democratic | Republican |
| Popular vote | 29,226 | 21,303 |
| Percentage | 56.82% | 41.41% |
Mayor before election
James D. Phelan
Democratic
Elected Mayor
James D. Phelan
Democratic

The 1899 San Francisco mayoral election was held on November 7, 1899. James D. Phelan was re-elected with 56% of the vote. It was the first election held under the new city charter.

== Results ==
1899 San Francisco mayoral election
| Party | Candidate | Votes | % |
|---|---|---|---|
| Democratic | James D. Phelan | 29,226 | 56.82% |
| Republican | Horace Davis | 21,303 | 41.41% |
| Socialist Labor | J. H. Hall | 664 | 1.29% |
| Social Democratic | A. H. Coburn | 162 | 0.31% |
| Populist | C. D. Cleveland | 63 | 0.12% |
| Total votes | | 51,438 | 100.00 |
| Democratic hold | | | |
