= Charles Clayton =

American politician (1825–1885)

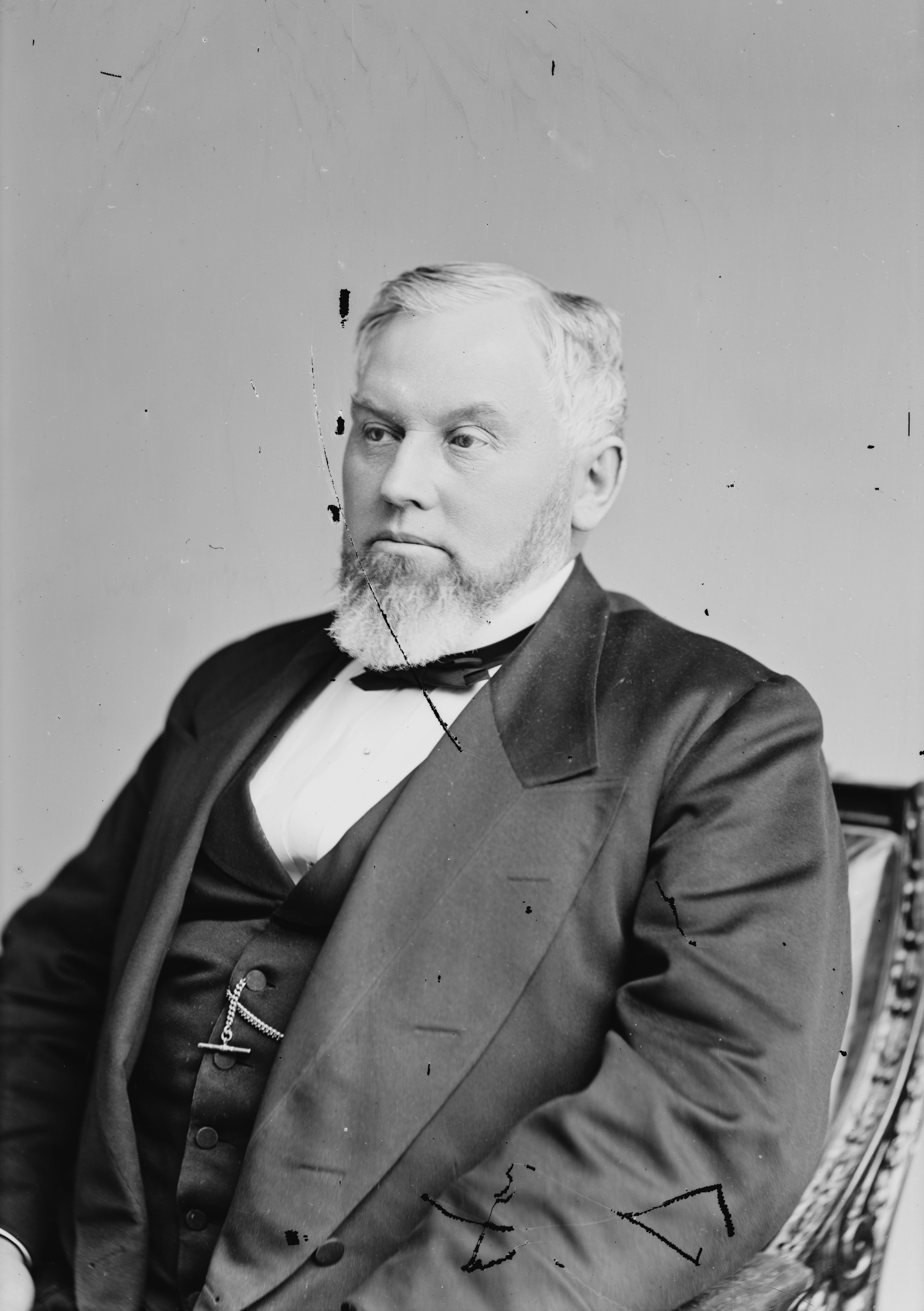
- Portrait by Brady c. 1873–1875

Member of the U.S. House of Representatives from California's 1st district
- In office March 4, 1873 – March 3, 1875
- Preceded by: Sherman Otis Houghton
- Succeeded by: William Adam Piper

Personal details
- Born: October 5, 1825 Derbyshire, England
- Died: October 4, 1885 (aged 59) Oakland, California
- Resting place: Mountain View Cemetery, Oakland
- Party: Republican

Charles Clayton (October 5, 1825 – October 4, 1885) was a 19th-century American miller and politician who served one term as a United States representative from California.

== Biography ==
He was born in Derbyshire, England. He was the Alcalde of Santa Clara, California from 1849 to 1850. He was a miller and founded the Santa Clara flour mills.

=== San Francisco ===
Sketch by Edward Jump, 1865

Clayton was one of San Francisco's 12 representatives in the California State Assembly from 1863 to 1867. He was also a member of the board of supervisors of San Francisco from 1864 to 1869. He was the United States surveyor of customs of the port and district of San Francisco in 1870.

=== Congress ===
He was elected as a Republican to the Forty-third Congress (March 4, 1873 – March 3, 1875). He was not a candidate for renomination to the Forty-fourth Congress in 1874.

=== Later career and death ===
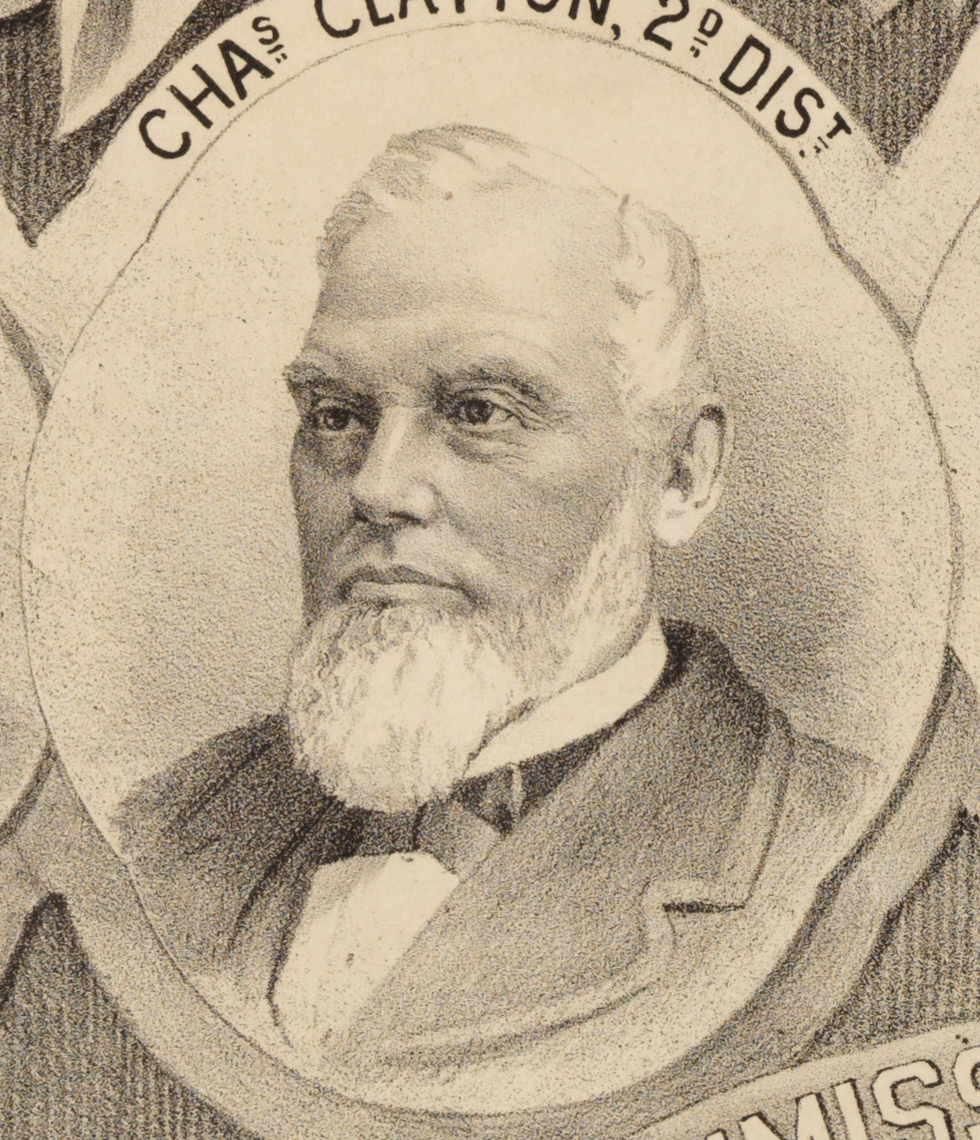
Engraving by Britton & Rey from a photograph by G. D. Morse, 1882

He also served as the California state prison director from 1881 to 1882.

Clayton died in Oakland, California, one day before his 60th birthday. He was buried in Mountain View Cemetery.

== Electoral history ==
1872 United States House of Representatives elections
Party	Candidate	Votes	%
Republican	Charles Clayton	11,938	52.3
Democratic	William Adam Piper	10,883	47.7
Total votes		22,821	100.0
Republican win (new seat)			

== Sources ==
- United States Congress. "Charles Clayton (id: C000493)". Biographical Directory of the United States Congress.

California Assembly
Preceded by 12 members	California State Assemblyman, 8th District (San Francisco seat); 1863–1867 (with 11 others)	Succeeded by 12 members
U.S. House of Representatives
Preceded by Sherman O. Houghton	Member of the U.S. House of Representatives from California's 1st congressional district 1873–1875	Succeeded by William Adam Piper
