= Ethel Myers =

American sculptor (1881–1960)

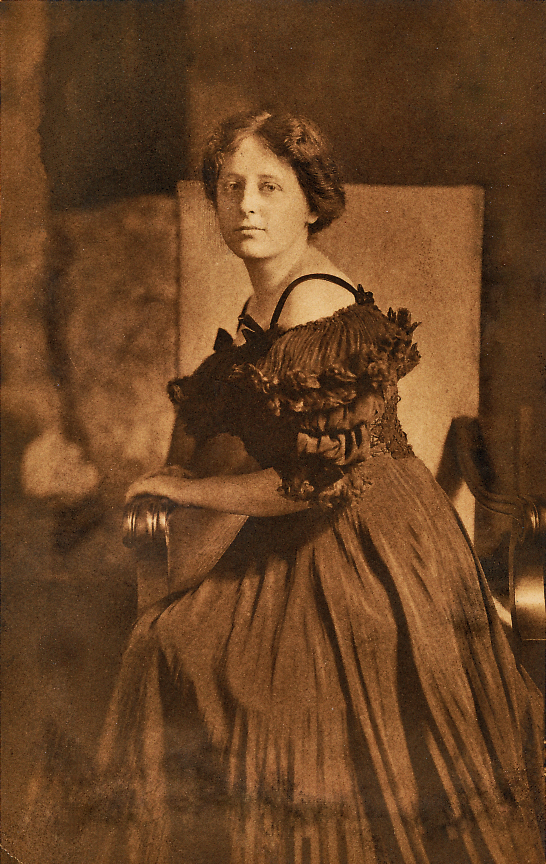
- Ethel Myers, 1908
- Born: Lillian Cochran; August 23, 1881; Brooklyn, New York
- Died: May 24, 1960 (aged 78); Cornwall, New York
- Education: The Chase School, New York School of Art
- Known for: Sculpture, drawing, painting
- Notable work: The Matron, The Gambler (Joe Johnson), Florence Reed, Encounter, Ambulance Call
- Movement: New York Realists, Ashcan School
- Spouse: Jerome Myers

Mae Ethel Klinck Myers (August 23, 1881 – May 24, 1960), better known as Ethel Myers, was an American artist, sculptor, and designer. A New York Realist strongly influenced by the Ashcan School and its leader Robert Henri, she began her career as a painter documenting life on the Lower East Side before establishing herself as a figurative sculptor. She is best known for her small bronze statuettes capturing the everyday life and types of New York City with wit and formal invention. She exhibited nine sculptures at the landmark Armory Show of 1913, where art historian Charlotte Rubinstein has written that she "was one of the most creative of the Americans who exhibited." In later life she worked as a fashion designer, educator, and arts lecturer, and promoted the career of her husband, painter Jerome Myers.

== Early life ==
Mae Ethel Klinck was born in Brooklyn, New York on August 23, 1881, originally named Lillian Cochran. Her mother, who was twenty years old at the time of her birth, was seriously ill and died when Ethel was four. Her father had already died, leaving her an orphan. She was adopted by Michael and Alfiata Klinck, an affluent couple who renamed her Mae Ethel Klinck. After Michael Klinck's death, Alfiata moved between Brooklyn and Orange, New Jersey, providing Ethel with a broad early education in both public and private schools. Her adoptive mother encouraged her to pursue the piano in hopes that she might become a concert pianist.

Ethel found her piano studies unrewarding. She later recalled: "I decided I wanted to be a painter. I never had any other idea. So in my second year in the Newark high school I left and went to the National Academy in New York City... After several months I took the examination at the Academy and failed... but I said no — I have gone to the Chase School." She studied at the Chase School (William Merritt Chase) and the New York School of Art from 1898 to 1904, becoming a favourite pupil of Chase and also studying with Henri, who would exert a lasting influence on her work. Among her fellow students were Edward Hopper, Guy Pène du Bois, Gifford Beal, and Joseph Stella. She also became personally acquainted with the painters George Luks, John Sloan, William Glackens, Arthur B. Davies, Ernest Lawson, and Elmer Livingston MacRae.

While at the Chase School she was appointed monitor of a class, and later became assistant director and teacher alongside John Douglas Connah, the school's director. She credited herself with bringing Henri to the school: "It was there that I was instrumental in getting Robert Henri in the school. It had then become the New York School of Art at Sixth Avenue and Fifty-Seventh Street."

== Early career ==
Ethel's early subjects as a painter were drawn from immigrant working-class life. A contemporary account in The International Studio (1905) described how she studied the Jewish district of New York, bounded by Delancey and Hester Streets, attending the Norfolk Street Synagogue on the Day of Atonement, and also visited the Italian and Hebrew districts of Boston's Salem Street. Characteristically she did not sketch on the spot, finding that such methods produced unnatural results; instead, she observed by blending in with the communities she depicted, "carrying home sketches in the mind's eye merely."

== Artistic career and the Armory Show ==
Ethel first met artist Jerome Myers in 1904. After following his work at the Macbeth Gallery for two years and collecting press notices about him, she arranged to meet him in his studio; they subsequently visited each other's studios. They married in a small church ceremony in October 1905. Ethel's adoptive mother disapproved of the marriage, preferring Ethel's earlier engagement to a businessman, and subsequently cut off the inheritance she had promised her daughter.

After the birth of their daughter Virginia on October 21, 1906, Ethel made a decisive shift from painting to sculpture, in part to free studio space for Jerome's work. She developed a distinctive body of small, realistic bronze statuettes depicting recognisable New York types — society women, gamblers, vaudeville performers, and street figures — with what critics described as "a quite uncommon sense of humor, and with more than this, a feeling for form and movement that gives them life and conviction."

In 1912–1913, Ethel exhibited bronze statuettes at the Folsom Galleries in New York, to considerable critical acclaim. The Craftsman declared: "In the past Mrs. Myers has been better known to the artist world as a painter of courage and skill, for the future she must rank, whether she will or no, as a sculptor with the power of presenting through her work a knowledge of life and understanding of human psychology as rare as it is interesting." The New York Times called her "a serious humorist, a Forain of Fifth Avenue," and The Brooklyn Eagle placed her "alongside of Daumier, Meunier and Mahonri Young."

She exhibited nine sculptures at the 1913 Armory Show, which introduced modernist art to a wide American public. Theodore Roosevelt, writing in The Outlook after visiting the show, singled out her small group Gossip: "The little group called 'Gossip' by Ethel Myers is one which has something of the quality of the famous Fifteenth Idyl of Theocritus." The critic Henry McBride wrote to her: "Must congratulate you heartily on your little figures at the Folsom's. It's a case of good goods coming in small packages... Most charming things of the kind I've ever seen."

=== Selected bronze statuettes ===
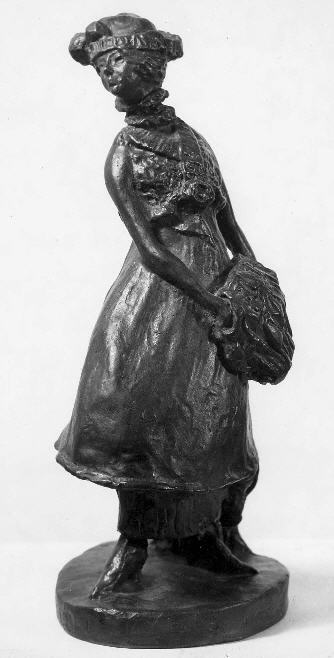
Haughty Damsel

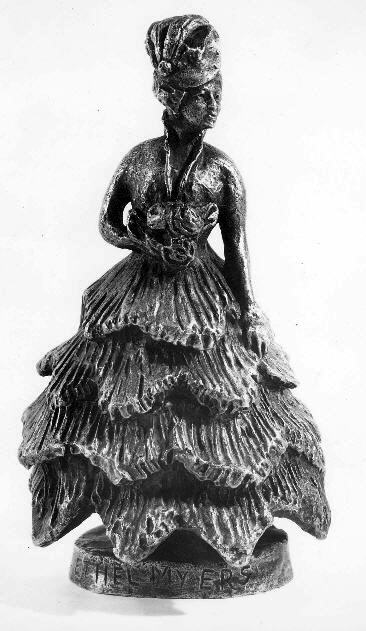
Crinoline Girl

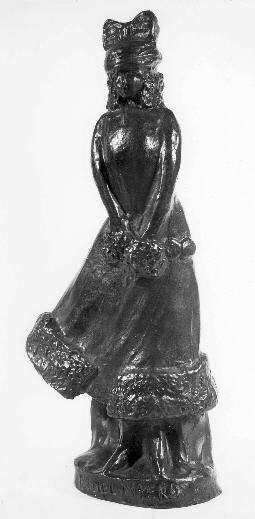
The Big Bow

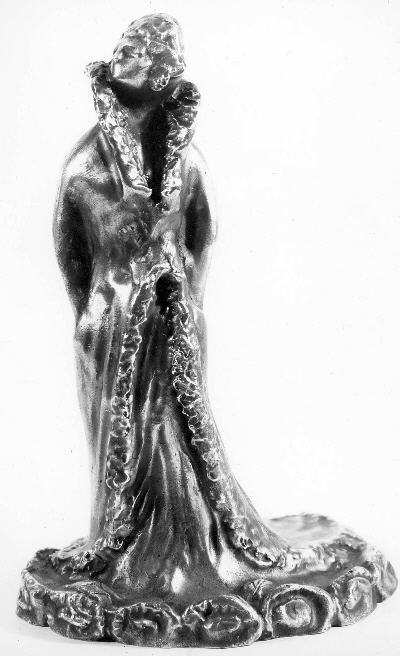
Flowered Gown

== Consequences of the Armory Show and wartime Europe ==
Jerome Myers had been central to organising the American contingent of the 1913 Armory Show, but the event largely redirected critical attention toward European modernists rather than American artists. Anticipating that this shift would disadvantage American artists commercially, the Myers family left for Europe in June 1914, carrying Jerome's paintings in the hope of finding buyers. The outbreak of the First World War — exactly one month after their departure — stranded them in Paris; on advice from the American Embassy, they immediately began the arduous journey back to America.

== Later career: fashion design and education ==
On returning to New York, Ethel turned to fashion design as a means of supporting her family. Beginning with five dollars spent on lace for a blouse design sold to a Fifth Avenue shop, she built a clothing design business that she maintained from approximately 1920 to 1940, creating clothes and hats for "noted celebrities of society, stage, and opera and for manufacturers." During this period she also managed the career of her daughter Virginia, who had emerged as a gifted dancer from the age of three. Ethel organised seventeen recitals for Virginia in New York theatres, handling bookings, contracts, costumes, set design, and publicity. Virginia starred in an Edison-produced film, Dream Dances of Virginia Myers, and performed at Carnegie Hall in April and December 1923. Virginia was celebrated in a 1913 Vogue article, "When Virginia Dances," which called her "a child of the century."

Following Jerome Myers's death in 1940, Ethel lectured on his work throughout the United States under the auspices of the American Federation of Arts (1941–43), and maintained the Jerome Myers Memorial Gallery in New York City for a number of years. From 1949 until her retirement in 1959, she was Art Director of the Fine Arts and Ceramics Department at Christodora House in New York City.
