= Camarillo Public Library =

Library in Camarillo, California, US

Coordinates: 34°14′36″N 119°0′50″W

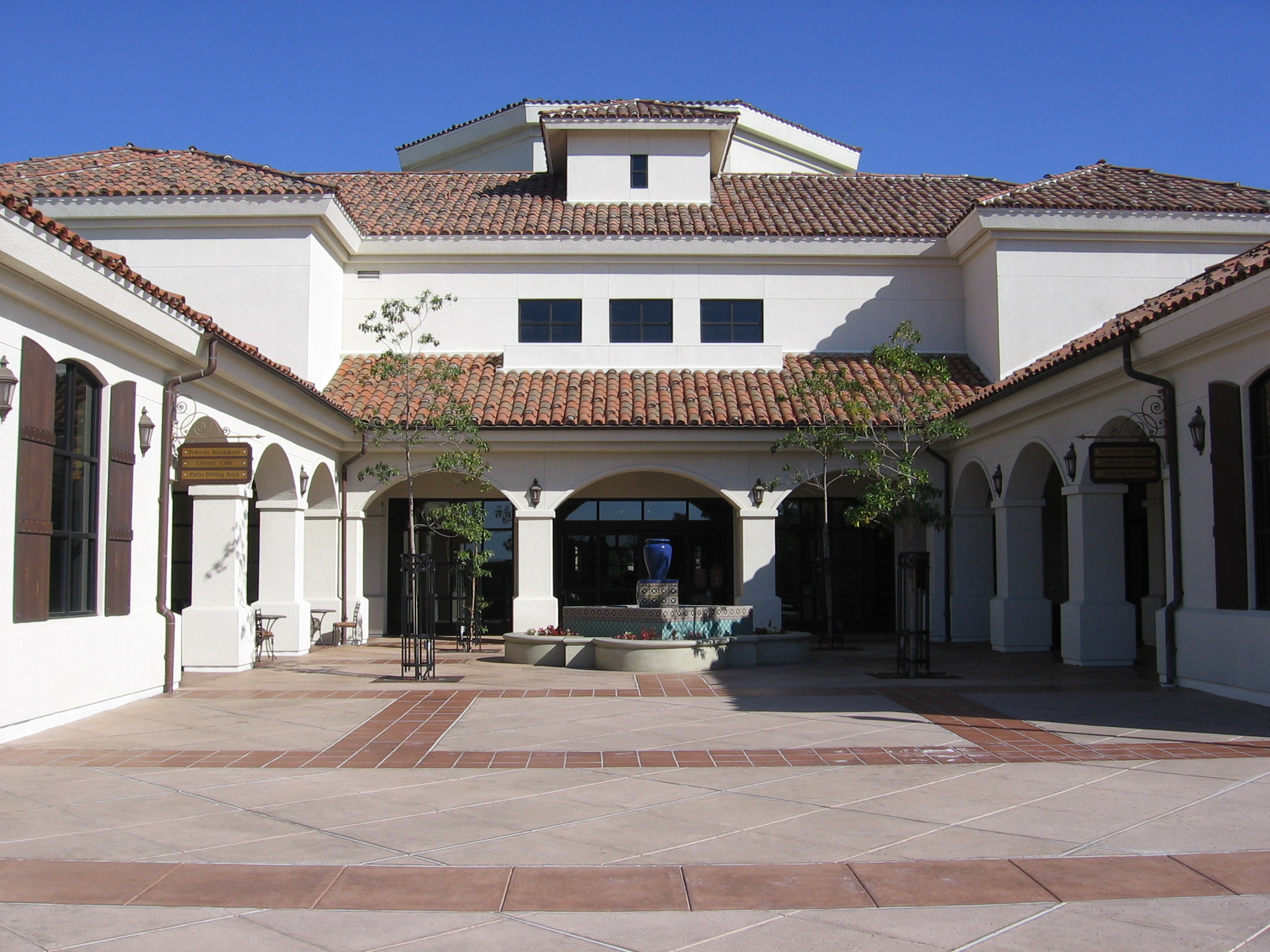
Main entrance, The City of Camarillo Public Library

The City of Camarillo Public Library serves the residents of Camarillo, California. Camarillo Public Library will issue a free library card to any applicant with acceptable identification, as provided in the library's registration policy. Camarillo Public Library is located at 4101 Las Posas Road, on the corner of Las Posas Road and Fieldgate Drive.

== History ==
The first library in Camarillo, which opened in 1895, consisted of a set of readers in a hallway at Pleasant Valley School. On April 8, 1915, Adolfo Camarillo spoke at a public hearing before the Ventura County Board of Supervisors in favor of establishing a countywide library system. The Camarillo Branch of the Ventura County Free Library opened on January 6, 1919, with a collection of 75 books. It was located in Mr. Israel Hernandez's Camarillo Mercantile Company until 1920, when it moved to a room in the Conejo Inn, owned by Mr. & Mrs. F.B. Merrill who welcomed borrowers anytime. After the Inn went out of business in 1931, Mrs. Ruth Fellows offered her sun porch as a temporary library. In December 1933, Adele Flynn became the Branch Library Assistant and moved the collection of 350 books to a cubbyhole in the post office and then to the Cawelti building. It was open for 2 hours on Mondays and Fridays. From April 1, 1941, to 1962, the library was located in a room in the new Community Center on Ventura Boulevard. The collection grew to 8,000 books. The two most popular library books in 1952 were The Caine Mutiny and The Old Man and the Sea.

On May 18, 1962, a new branch was dedicated at Dizdar Park with room for 15,000 books, and a large reading area. Adele Flynn became the Children's Librarian and organized storytimes, the annual summer reading program, and other events to attract children to the library. On October 27, 1974, the library opened at 3100 Ponderosa Drive. Additionally, The Friends of the Camarillo Library was organized that year. The computerized circulation system was installed in 1982, replacing the card catalogue. The internet center for public use was dedicated in January, 1999. By 2007, the collection had grown to 120,000 items that included video cassettes, DVDs, music CDs, audiobooks, periodicals, and books.

On March 31, 2007, the library opened in a state-of-the-art building at 4101 Las Posas Road. On October 13, 2010, the Camarillo City Council voted to leave the Ventura County Library system, and the City of Camarillo Public Library opened as a municipal library on January 3, 2011.

== Architects ==
The library was designed by Charles Walton & Associates (CWA). The chief architect was James Nadini. Judy Van Wyk was the interior designer for the project.

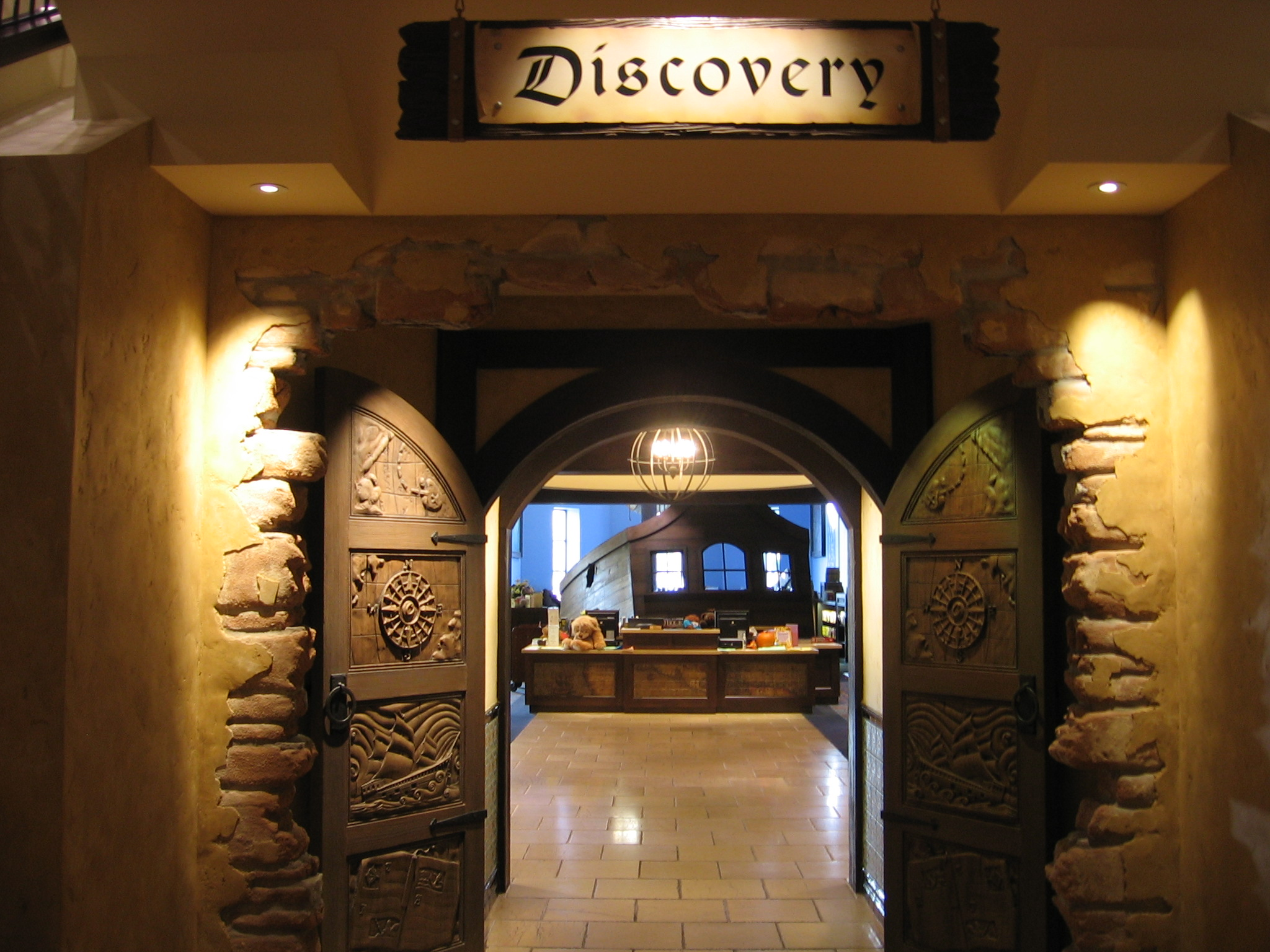
Children's Room entrance

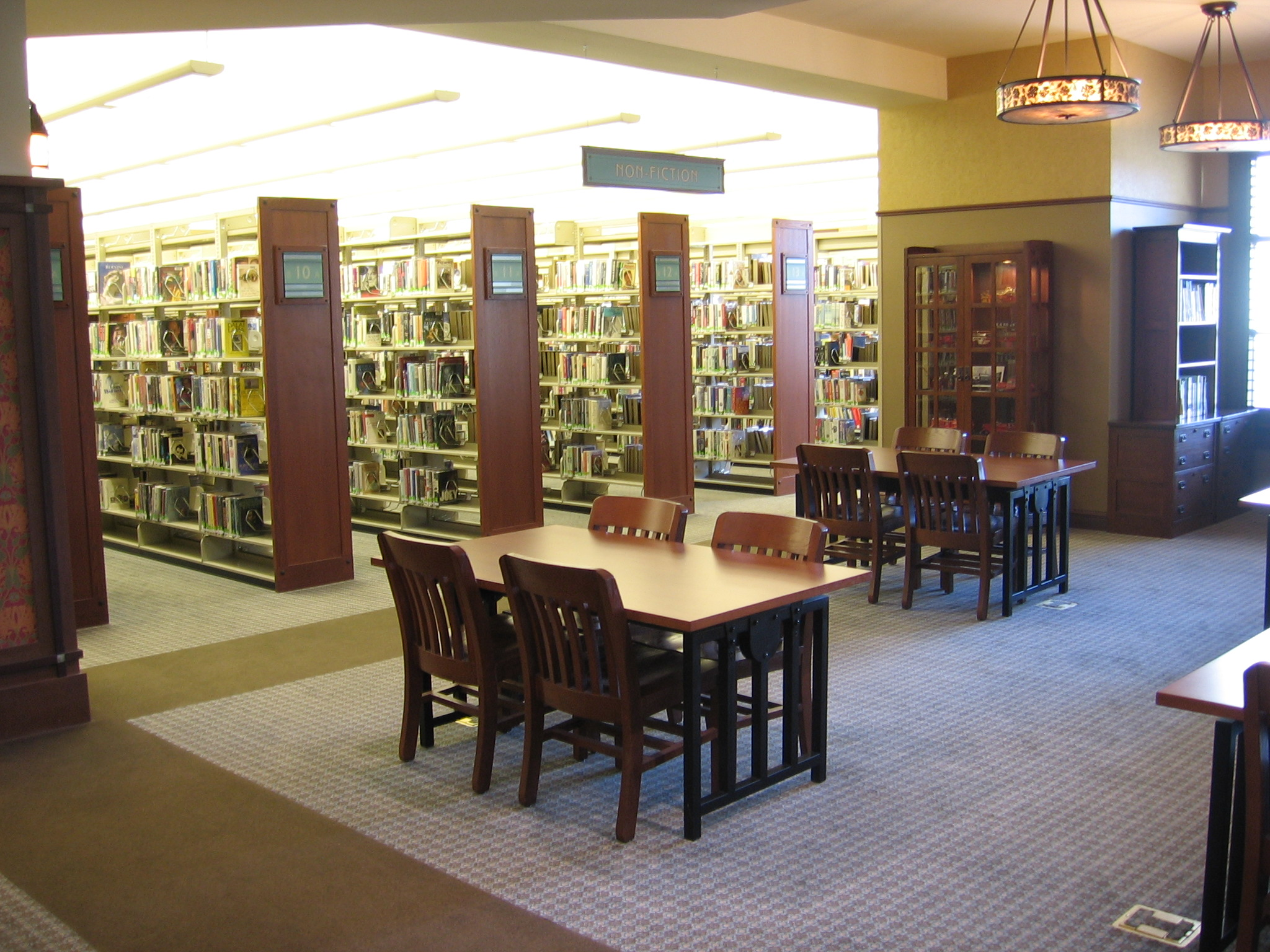
Non-fiction collection

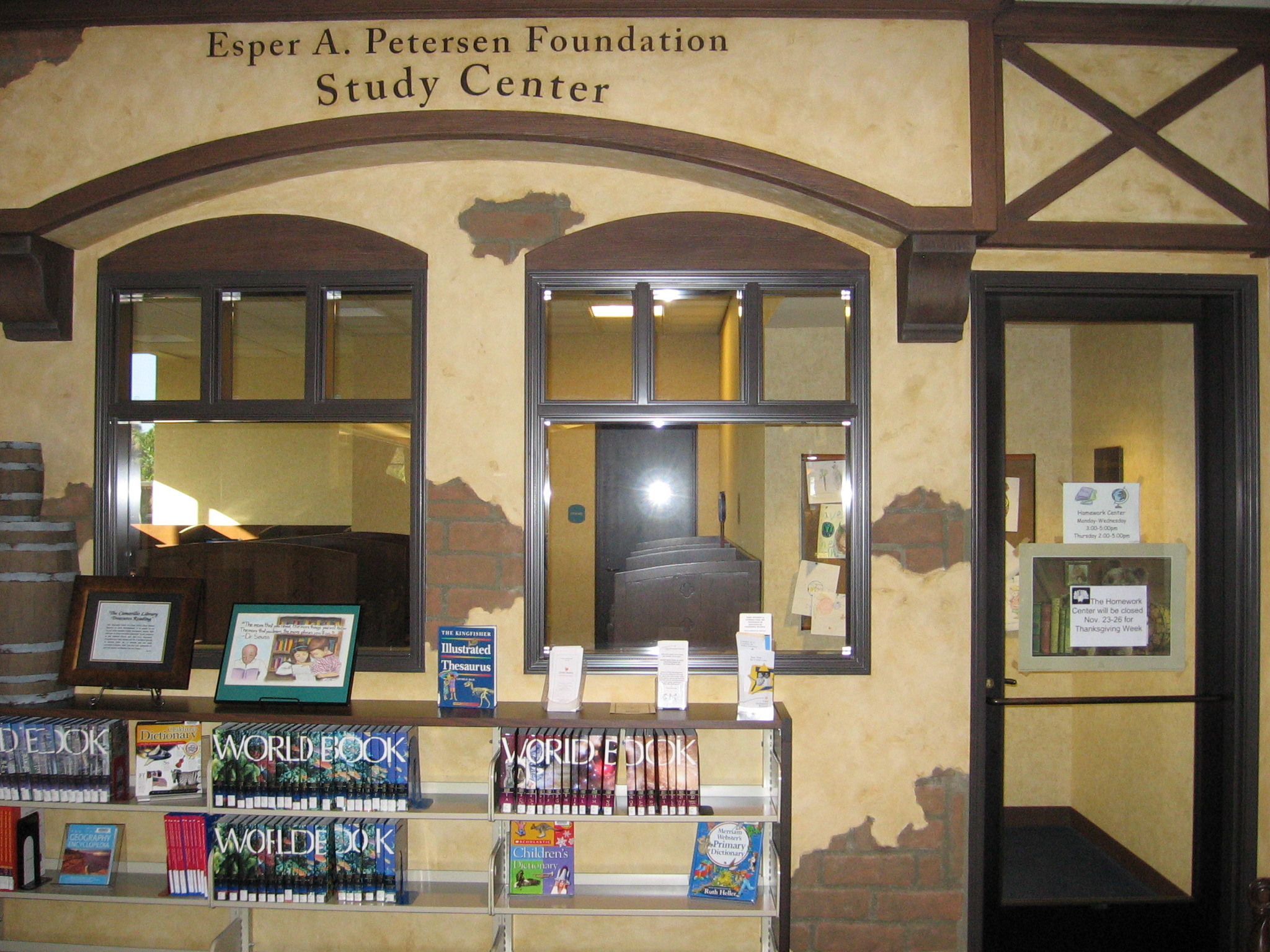
Esper A. Petersen Foundation
Study Center

== Financing ==
The building was funded by a grant of $15,621,473 from the California Public Library Construction & Renovation Act of 2000 and $11 million from the City of Camarillo. The Esper A. Petersen Foundation provided a $375,000 grant for the Esper A. Petersen Foundation Study Center.

== Size ==
The current library location is four times larger than the old building that opened in 1974. The 65,621-square-foot (6,096.4 m^{2}) building includes the Friends of the Camarillo Library Book store, Giant Steps Cafe, an Adult Literacy Center, the library community room, a board room, a conference room, a technology lab, five study rooms, and the Esper A. Petersen Foundation Study Center.

== Books & Materials ==
For the opening of the new building on March 31, 2007, 40,000 items were added to the 120,000 items that had been housed in the previous building. In 2008, the collection grew to 176,000 items. Since opening as a municipal library, the collection has grown to over 209,000 items. The library also subscribes to a variety of electronic databases, which provide patrons with remote access to thousands of periodical articles, e-books, e-audiobooks, online music, and more. Furthermore, the library houses, on loan, the Ventura County Genealogical Society's reference collection.

== Technology ==
The library has 54 computers that are internet accessible, wireless internet access throughout the building, and a technology lab with six computers. The library also uses RFID in concert with self checkout computers.

== Artwork ==
The pirate ship, book columns, and all of the artwork was created by Scenario Design, Inc., who has also produced work for Disneyland. The plaques next to each of the works of art give information about the inspiration for the piece and the name of the artist. The California Mission style tiles were made by the California Tile Company. The fountain, tile "carpets", and peacock were inspired by 1930s era Malibu tile, seen at the Adamson House in Malibu.

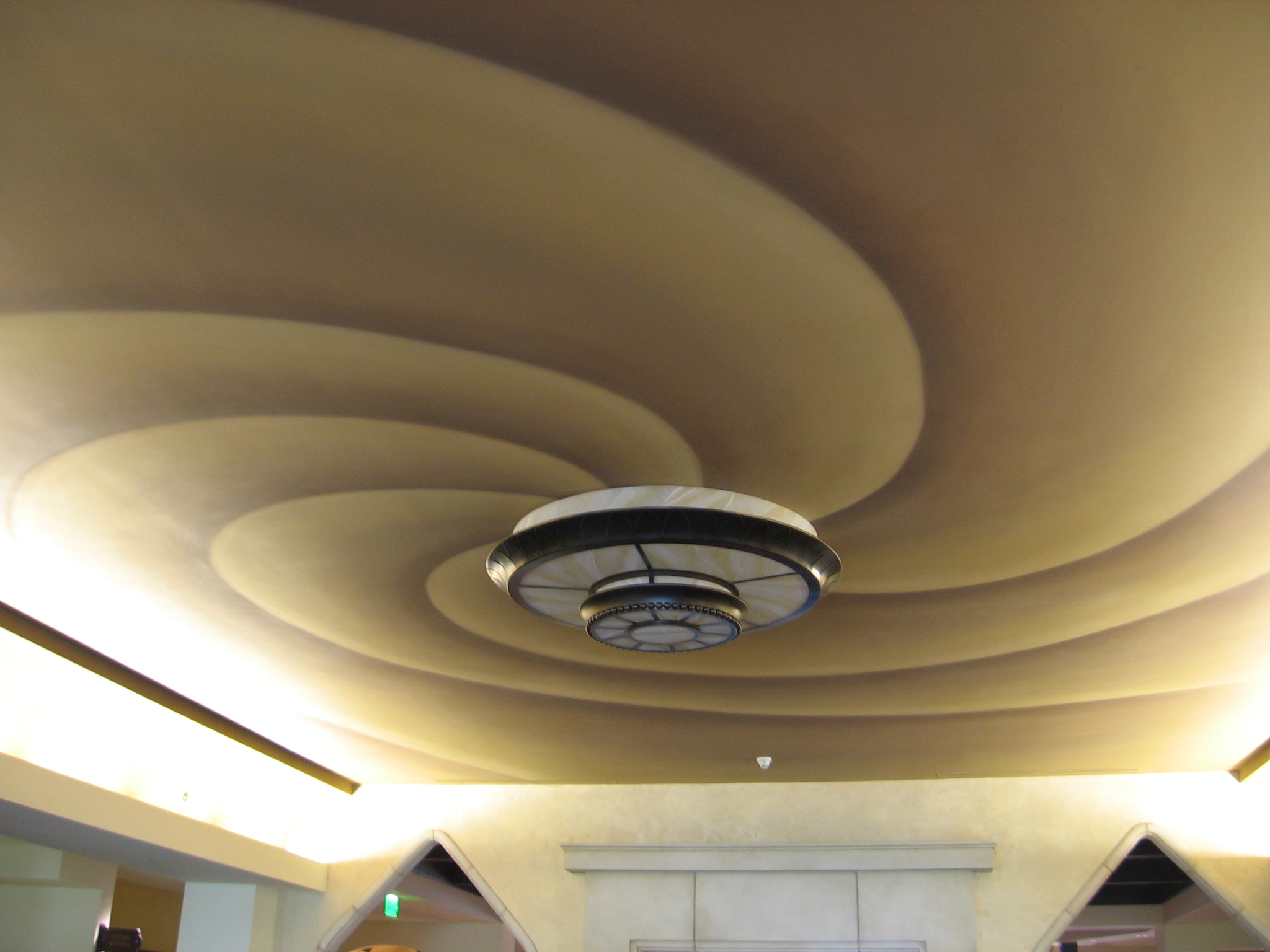
Young Adult Room ceiling

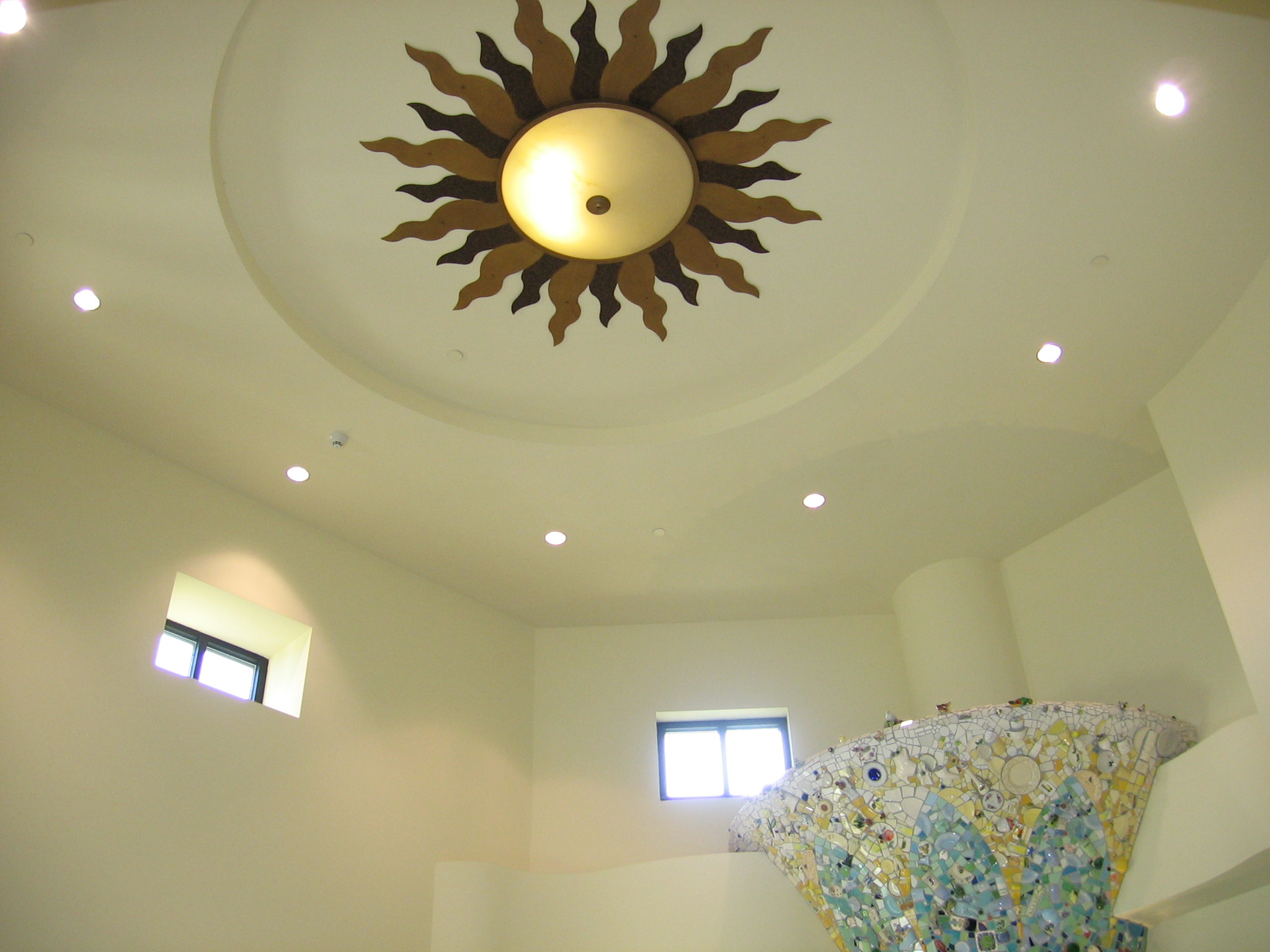
Audio-Visual Room ceiling
