= Joe Borchard =

American baseball player (born 1978)

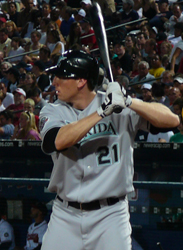
- Borchard with the Florida Marlins
- Outfielder
- Born: November 25, 1978 (age 47); Panorama City, Los Angeles, California, U.S.
- Batted: Switch Threw: Right

MLB debut
- September 2, 2002, for the Chicago White Sox

Last MLB appearance
- August 5, 2007, for the Florida Marlins

MLB statistics
- Batting average: .205
- Home runs: 26
- Runs batted in: 77
- Stats at Baseball Reference

Teams
- Chicago White Sox (2002–2005); Seattle Mariners (2006); Florida Marlins (2006–2007)
Medals
Men's baseball
Representing United States
Baseball World Cup
Silver medal – second place	2001 Taipei	National team

Joseph Edward Borchard (born November 25, 1978) is an American former Major League Baseball (MLB) outfielder. Borchard was the 12th pick of the first round in the 2000 Major League Baseball draft out of Stanford University by the Chicago White Sox. In high school, he won a division III state football championship at Adolfo Camarillo High School as the starting quarterback. He also played quarterback for Stanford and took a $5.3 million signing bonus to play for the White Sox. The signing bonus was the highest ever given to a player for a minor league contract until Justin Upton received $6.1 million to sign with the Arizona Diamondbacks in 2005.

== College ==
Borchard attended Stanford University where he played baseball as an outfielder and football as a quarterback. He was inducted into the Stanford Athletics Hall of Fame in 2023.

=== Football ===
In 1998 Borchard was the Cardinal backup quarterback behind Todd Husak and played in seven games in which he tallied 317 yards and three touchdowns. In 1999 Borchard completed 42-of-71 passes for 747 yards and seven touchdowns and led the Pac-10 with a 177.3 pass efficiency rating, but did not have enough attempts to qualify for the national statistics. He made national headlines after his performance in a victory over UCLA in a relief role after Husak left the game with bruised ribs early in the second quarter. Borchard came on and threw for 324 yards and five touchdowns and was named USA Today's National Player of the Week for his effort. The five TD passes in a game tied Borchard with several others for the second most in school history. The following week, with Husak sidelined, Borchard made his starting debut against San Jose State and threw for 313 yards and two touchdowns and also rushed for one score.

=== Baseball ===
Joe was a twice named to the First-Team All-Pac-10 in 1999 and 2000. Stanford's website claims him to be "among the best players in the history of Stanford baseball." In three seasons, he hit 40 home runs with 187 RBI and a .346 batting average. In the Cardinal record book, he ranks eighth in home runs and batting average and ninth in RBI.

== Professional baseball ==
Borchard's career with the White Sox was less than impressive, as he struggled to make consistent contact, an issue that plagued him throughout his career. Borchard's most significant big league playing time came in the 2004 season, where he received 201 at-bats. He hit .174 that year with 9 home runs and 20 RBI. Borchard's most notable feat was setting the US Cellular Field home run distance record, yet to be eclipsed at 504 feet off Philadelphia Phillies pitcher Brett Myers.

Borchard was traded to the Seattle Mariners on March 20, 2006, for Matt Thornton, a left-handed relief pitcher. On May 3, 2006, the Florida Marlins claimed Borchard off waivers.

The Atlanta Braves signed Borchard to a minor league contract during the 2007 MLB winter meetings in Nashville, Tennessee.

On May 28, 2008, Borchard had season ending Tommy John surgery, but was re-signed by the Braves for the 2009 season. However, on April 24, Borchard was released.

On May 28, 2009 Borchard signed with the Giants. He played for the organization's AAA affiliate, the Fresno Grizzlies, for the next two years. On May 3, 2010, he became the second Grizzly to hit for the cycle (joining Nate Schierholtz) when he went five for six in the Grizzlies' 14–4 victory over the Colorado Springs Sky Sox.

On March 25, 2011 Borchard signed with the Bridgeport Bluefish of the Atlantic League of Professional Baseball. On June 2, 2011, he announced his retirement from baseball.

== Personal life ==
Born in the Panorama City neighborhood of Los Angeles, Borchard attended Adolfo Camarillo High School in Camarillo, California. He has 2 children and lives in Ventura county. His sister Julie played college softball at the University of Wisconsin from 1995 to 1999. She played shortstop.
