= Adolfo Camarillo High School =

Public high school in California, United States

Location
- 4660 Mission Oaks Boulevard; Camarillo, California 93012; United States; 34°13′3″N 119°0′28″W

Information
- Type: Public
- Established: 1956
- School district: Oxnard Union High School District
- Principal: Aaron Peck
- Teaching staff: 80.15 (FTE)
- Enrollment: 1,932 (2023–2024)
- Student to teacher ratio: 24.10
- Campus: Suburban
- Colors: Blue and white
- Fight song: Wave the Flag (for Old Chicago)
- Athletics conference: CIF Southern Section; Coastal Canyon League
- Nickname: Scorpions
- Rival: Rio Mesa High School
- Newspaper: The Stinger
- Website: www.camarillohigh.us

Adolfo Camarillo High School (ACHS) is a public high school in Camarillo, California established 1956. The school is part of the Oxnard Union High School District and serves students in grades 9–12 in east Camarillo, Somis, and the Santa Rosa Valley. ACHS is named for Adolfo Camarillo, a prominent Californio ranchero and founder of the city which bears his name; he donated part of Rancho Calleguas for the high school.

== History ==
Adolfo Camarillo, who founded the city of Camarillo and was instrumental in the creation of the Oxnard Union High School District, donated 50 acres (20 ha) of his Rancho Calleguas property for a public high school in 1950. Adolfo Camarillo High School opened in 1956, initially educating high school students from the Camarillo and Conejo Valley areas. (Thousand Oaks High School opened in 1962 to serve the latter.)

== Athletics ==
Adolfo Camarillo High School's athletic teams are nicknamed the Scorpions. The school is a charter member of the Coastal Canyon League (CCL), a conference within the CIF Southern Section (CIF-SS) that was established in 2014. ACHS competes in the CCL for all sports except football and in the Marmonte Football Association for football. Prior to 2014, the school was a long-time member of the Pacific View League. Camarillo's primary rival is Rio Mesa High School.

The first ACHS team to earn a CIF-SS championship was the boys' basketball team in 1972. soccer team, a 1983 co-championship with Dos Pueblos High School after playing to a 3–3 draw in the final.

The ACHS softball team won three CIF-SS championships in 1991, 2011, and 2017; the first of these came against Buena High School.

Camarillo won section titles in baseball in 2002, boys' volleyball in 2003, and boys' wrestling (dual-meet championship) in 2015.

The school hosts the Camarillo Classic, a well known early season, two-day invitational track-and-field event, every March. It attracts dozens of teams from all over Southern California. The Distance Classic portion of the event has attracted notable athletes such as Jordan Hasay, Duane Solomon and Christine Babcock to come and produce record-breaking performances at the Camarillo Classic. In 2007, when Hasay ran her meet record 10:04.07 in the 3200 meters, both standing national record holders in the event, Kim Mortensen and Jeff Nelson, were in attendance.

=== Football ===
Adolfo Camarillo High School has earned three CIF-SS football championships. The first was in 1984 when the Scorpions defeated Ventura High School at the Los Angeles Memorial Coliseum. In 1996, ACHS beat Notre Dame High School of Sherman Oaks 20–16 in a matchup that pitted quarterback and future MLB outfielder Joe Borchard against future NFL running back Justin Fargas. Camarillo won its most recent title in 2015, beating Thousand Oaks High School 55–27 and finishing Southern Section play with a 14–0 record. That same year, the Scorpions won the CIF Southern California regional title in Division 2-AA and appeared in the state championship game.

== Notable alumni ==
- Bryan Anger, National Football League punter
- Boston Bateman, professional baseball player in the Baltimore Orioles organization
- Joe Borchard, Major League Baseball player
- Randy Elliott, MLB outfielder, San Diego Padres
- Jerry Finn, music producer
- Jeremy Fischer, USA Track & Field coach
- Joel Hodge, cinematographer
- Gabriela Jaquez, professional basketball player for Chicago Sky
- Jaime Jaquez Jr., professional basketball player for Miami Heat
- Erik Komatsu, MLB player
- Tom Lenk, actor
- Jeff Mathews, Canadian Football League quarterback
- Jessica Mendoza, U.S. Olympic softball player and ESPN baseball broadcaster
- Randy Miller, MLB player
- Alex Nowrasteh, economist and immigration policy analyst
- Mike Parrott, MLB player
- Marla Runyan, U.S. Paralympic gold medalist, one of only five athletes to participate in both the Paralympics and Olympics
- Kevin Shulman, Writer, Director, Producer
- Jeff Tackett, Major League Baseball player
- Hilary Van Dyke, actress
- Trevor Wallace, comedian and YouTube star
- Delmon Young, MLB and Australian Baseball League player
