= John R. Cruttenden =

American ornithologist

John R. Cruttenden was an American ornithologist. The Western Foundation of Vertebrate Zoology in Camarillo, California, houses egg sets and nests collected by Cruttenden throughout the Midwestern United States, Alaska, and Canada dated from 1890 to 1953. Cruttenden's collection found at the WFVZ includes all or a major portion of the collections of Edward Arnold (Michigan and Canada), Robert Charles, Thomas Browers (Alaska), John Lewis Childs (general North America), F.A. Dean (Ohio), and George C. Witheys' collection (North Dakota). Cruttenden died on September 7, 1956, in Quincy, Illinois.
