= Juan Camarillo Jr. =

American landowner and philanthropist

Juan E. Camarillo Jr. (April 10, 1867 – August 21, 1936) was a wealthy Californio landowner and philanthropist in Ventura County, California, United States. Juan and his elder brother Adolfo Camarillo lived in Casa Camarillo, and were involved in the mercantile business. Camarillo and his brother owned Rancho Calleguas upon the death of their father.

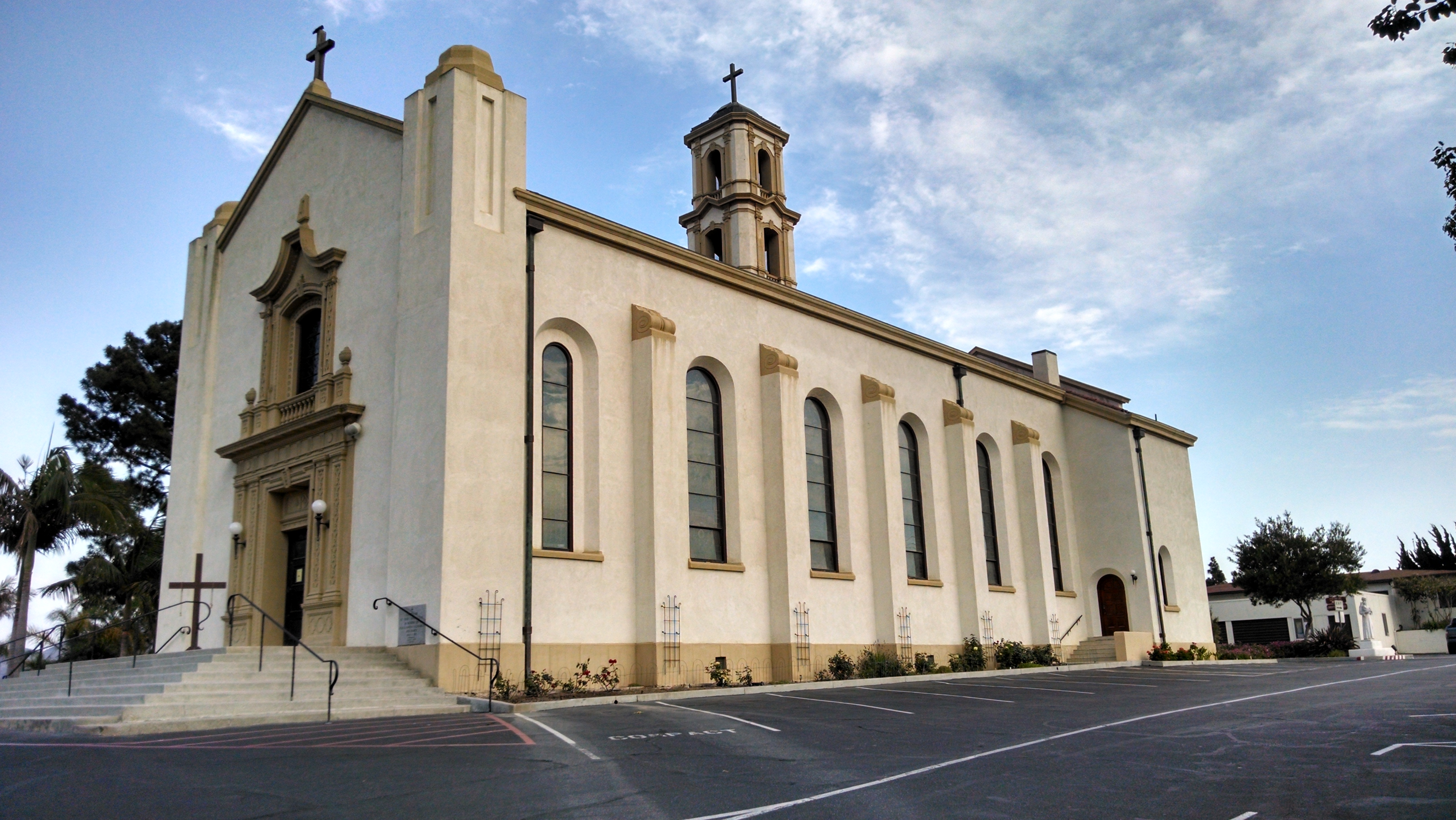
St. Mary Magdalene Chapel dedicated July 1, 1913. Albert C. Martin, architect.

== Philanthropy ==
On March 3, 1927, Camarillo donated 100 acres (0.40 km^{2}) to the Roman Catholic Archdiocese of Los Angeles for the purpose of creating a seminary. This land would later become the St. John's Seminary, named after Juan's patron saint. On July 27, 1927, Pope Pius XI enrolled Camarillo as a knight in the Pontifical Equestrian Order of Saint Sylvester. He was the first American to be given this honor. His will bequeathed the family chapel to the Order of the Friars Minor, who then donated it to the Archdiocese of Los Angeles. This chapel became the St. Mary Magdalen Catholic Church in Camarillo, California.

== See also ==
- Camarillo Ranch House
