= Surfware =

CAD/CAM software company

Surfware, Inc.
- Company type: Private
- Industry: CAD/CAM Software
- Founded: 1988
- Headquarters: Camarillo, California, US
- Key people: Alan Diehl, Founder
- Products: Surfcam
- Website: www.surfware.com

Surfware, Inc. is a Camarillo, CA-based company involved in the development of CAD/CAM software.

== Company history ==
In 1950, Victor Diehl opened a mold shop in Southern California for machine tooling medical products. Throughout the 1950s, Victor Diehl focused on precision mold products for the medical industry. In the 1960s, Victor and Alan Diehl got a numerical control machine (CNC) to expedite tooling of components for aircraft manufacturing. Ten years later, Alan and his brother-in-law Jack Epps, a physicist, built a smart NC machine powered by a mini-computer.

In 1980, Bryan and Larry Diehl, joined the machining firm and wrote a UNIX program for surface modeling and machining. In 1988, Surfware, Inc. was formed by Alan and Larry, and SURFCAM was launched—a PC-based modeling and NC programming software to be offered to the CAD/CAM industry.

Over the next decade, SURFCAM's features advanced along with the capabilities of the PC. Started with NURBS surface technology on a PC, PC-based four-axis machining, CAM system for 32-bit architectures, PC CAM system with automatic rendering of blended surfaces, 2- and 3-axis rest machining.

In 2002, Surfware began work on what would become the TrueMill technology, a completely new toolpath strategy that controls the load on the tool to significantly increase CNC productivity extending also tool life for all materials, including aluminum, steels, titanium, Inconel and other exotics. SURFCAM Velocity Powered by Truemill was launched in 2005, this CAD/CAM software limits the maximum stepover to cut optimally everywhere along the toolpath on any part geometry. A patent (US 7,451,013) has been granted to Surfware.Inc for its “Engagement Milling” technology (TrueMill).

Surfware headquarters in Thousand Oaks, California. It maintains its own suite of milling machines to test the latest developments and innovations in the state-of-the-art TrueMill technology.

In 2013 Surfcam was acquired by Vero Software

In 2014 Vero Software was acquired by Hexagon

== Release history ==
Name/Version	Build Number	Date
Surfcam	v4	Unknown
Surfcam	v5	Unknown
Surfcam	v5.1	Unknown
Surfcam	v5.2	Unknown
Surfcam	v6	Unknown
Surfcam	v2014	Unknown
Surfcam	v2015	Unknown
