= Adolfo Camarillo =

American businessman (1864–1958)

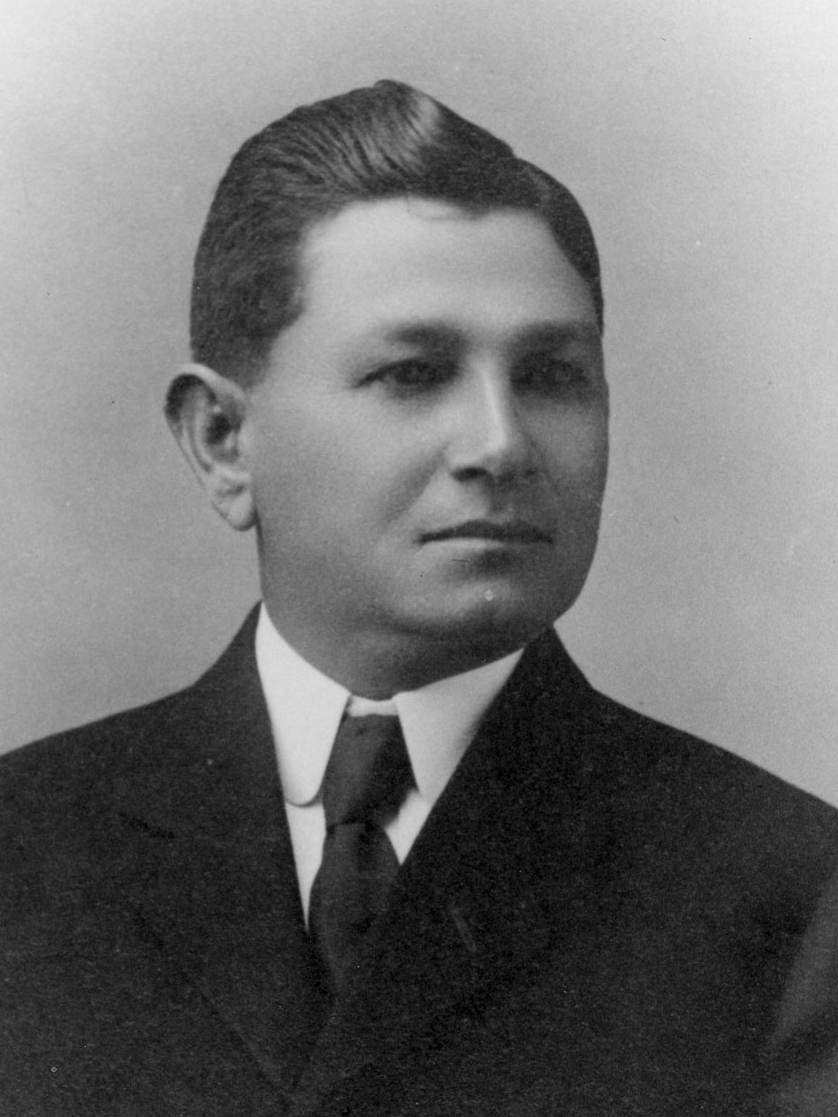
- Born: 29 October 1864; San Buenaventura, California
- Died: 10 December 1958 (aged 94); Camarillo, California
- Occupations: Ranchero, horse breeder

Don Adolfo Camarillo (29 October 1864 – 10 December 1958) was a prominent Californio philanthropist, ranchero, and horse breeder, known for founding the city of Camarillo, California, along with his brother Juan Camarillo Jr. Camarillo also donated the land for Adolfo Camarillo High School. The horse breed Camarillo White Horse was named for Camarillo. He began breeding them in 1921 and the line continues today. Because of his philanthropy in 1950, Pope Pius XII named him a Knight of St. Gregory the Great.

== Biography ==
Adolfo Camarillo was born to Juan (1812–1880) and Martina Camarillo (1826–1898). He had four sisters and one brother. In 1875, Juan purchased one of the last remaining Mexican land grants, Rancho Calleguas, from the Ruiz family; it was later willed to his wife. Upon Juan's death, Adolfo Camarillo took over operations of the family ranch at age 16. His brother Juan Jr. was more interested in religion. The ranch was almost 10,000 acres (4,000 ha), and was left to Adolfo and Juan Jr. upon the death of their mother. The land went on to become Camarillo Ranch, which in turn grew into the city of Camarillo. Adolfo Camarillo ran the ranch until his death in 1958.

In 1885, Camarillo graduated from the International Business College at Woodbury University in Los Angeles. After that he took over full-time management of the ranch at age 21. In 1888 he married Isabella Menchaca (1861–1936). He and Isabella raised seven children: Frank, Isabel, Minerva, Rosa, Carmen, Ave Marie, and Martina.

The ranch grew from a mostly cattle operation to both cattle and crops. Camarillo focused mainly in developing crops and became a leading innovator, bringing in lima beans, plus barley, corn, alfalfa, walnuts, and citrus.

Camarillo had a love of fiestas, horses, rodeos and barbecues. He kept a stable of a dozen pure white horses of Arabian and Morgan descent. His horses often participated in parades in California.

He died of pneumonia on December 10, 1958, and was interred in the family crypt beneath St. Mary Magdalen Church in Camarillo, alongside his parents, his wife, sisters and brother.

== Camarillo White Horses ==
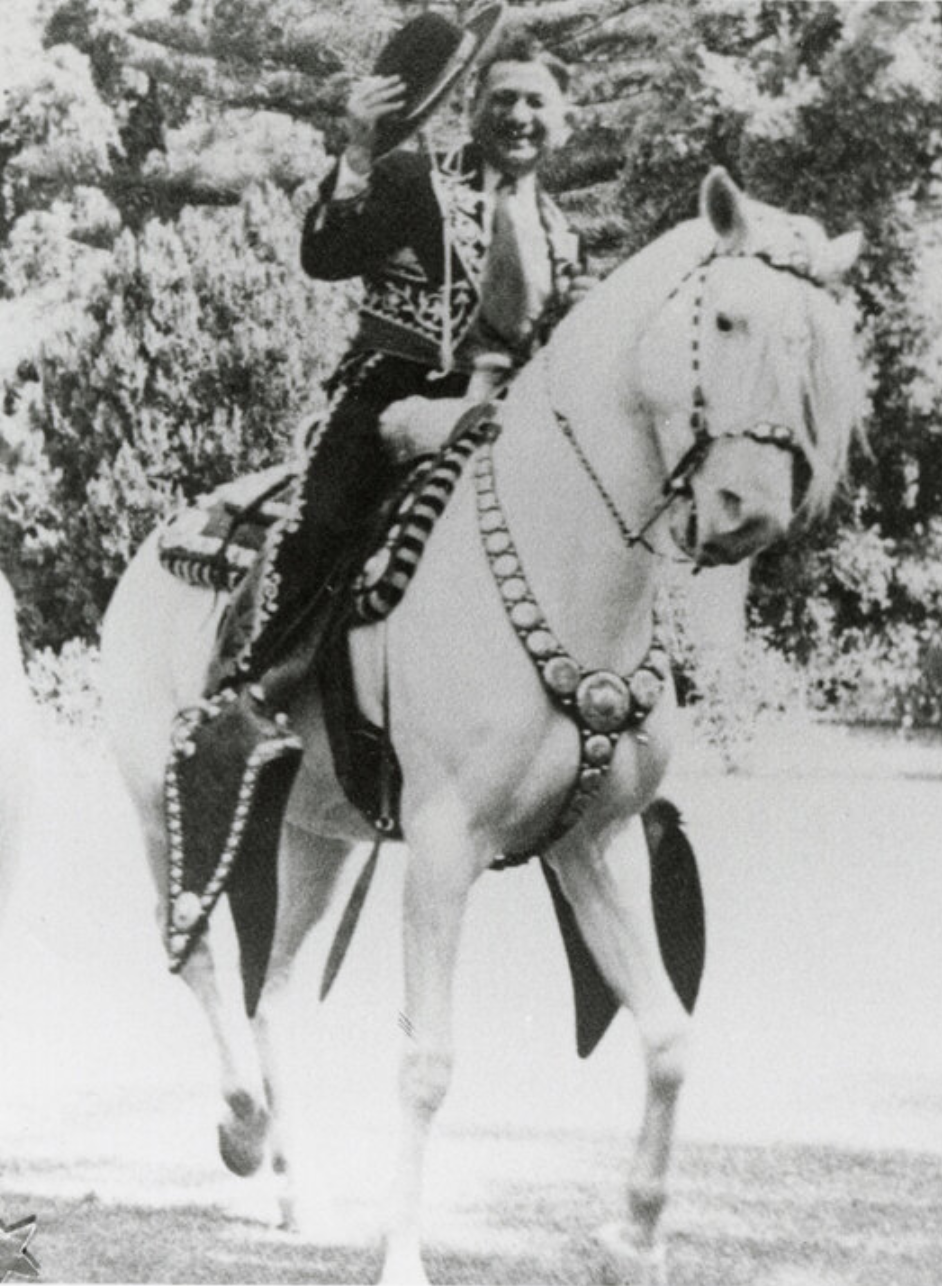
Camarillo on a Camarillo White Horse.

The Camarillo White Horse is a relatively Spanish-blooded horse known for its pure white color. This breed dates back to 1921, when Camarillo purchased a nine-year-old horse named Sultan from the Miller and Lux cattle ranch at the California State Fair in Sacramento. Over the next few years, Sultan won many stock championships throughout California. Camarillo bred Sultan to Morgan mares at his ranch. For the next 65 years the family privately owned and bred the Camarillo White Horses.

Since the 1930s these horses have become famous by being featured up and down the California coast at parades and events. Once a year Camarillo rode one of his white Arabians in the Fiesta of Santa Barbara while dressed up in a colorful Spanish costume. The Camarillo White Horses were privately owned and bred by the Camarillo family until the death of Camarillo's daughter Carmen in 1987, after which, according to her wishes, the horses were sold at public auction, ending the tradition of exclusive ownership of the breed by the Camarillo family. The city of Camarillo especially felt the loss, as the Camarillo White Horses were a favorite entry at the annual Christmas and Fiesta parades. The horses share the city's symbol with Adolfo Camarillo; it appears on all the street signs, city vehicles, banks, Chamber of Commerce insignia, and shopping centers.

Many people of note have ridden on Camarillo White Horses including Governor Ronald Reagan, President Warren G. Harding, and 1946 Nobel Peace Prize recipient John Mott, as well as movie stars Leo Carrillo and Steven Ford (son of President Gerald Ford).

As of 2010 there are only 20 Camarillo White Horses: three stallions, five mares, three geldings, two colts, and seven foals.

== Personal achievements ==
Camarillo was a member of the Ventura County Board of Supervisors for eight years. He also was a member of the Knights of Columbus, serving as Grand Knight of the Oxnard Council for two terms, was a member of the Benevolent and Protective Order of Elks of Santa Barbara, and was a member of the Native Sons of the Golden West.

Besides running his ranch he was a vice president of the First National Bank of Ventura, vice president of the Ojai State Bank of Nordhoff, a director of the Bank of A. Levy, of Oxnard, and was a stockholder in the First National Bank of Oxnard and in the Fillmore State Bank in Ventura County.

Camarillo had leadership roles on the Ventura County Fair Board and on the California State Fair Board, and in the Camarillo City Chamber of Commerce, Peoples Lumber Company, Los Rancheros Visitadores, and California Lima Bean Growers Association. He served as a member of the Pleasant Valley School District Board of Trustees for 57 years, from 1894 to 1951.

== Contributions ==
Camarillo made significant contributions to Ventura County. He helped found the Oxnard Union High School District on October 4, 1901. The boundary was from the Ventura River to the Los Angeles County line. In 1956, when the district was ready to build the first high school in Camarillo, he donated 50 acres of land. He was present for the groundbreaking of this school that was named after him. Adolfo Camarillo High School opened in 1958. According to Carol Yung, a volunteer at the Camarillo Ranch who is also a board member and tour guide for the Camarillo Ranch Foundation, the high school cheerleaders and band walked over to the Camarillo Ranch House to celebrate his birthday.

In 1904 Camarillo donated land to extend the Southern Pacific Railroad through Camarillo and for the expansion of St. John's Seminary to include St. John's College. He also donated land in 1937 for the Conejo Grade portion of the highway that is now the Ventura Freeway. In 1890 Camarillo, with the help of two Chumash Indian boys, planted two rows of eucalyptus trees. The trees lined Highway 101 in Camarillo for many years. Some of the trees are still present along the north side of the freeway.

== Camarillo Ranch House ==
The Camarillo Ranch House is a Queen Anne Victorian style home that was built in 1892 by Camarillo and several other workers; the house was a cultural and social hub that was the center of the ranch. Camarillo enlisted the services of architects Franklin Ward and Herman Anlauf. Camarillo used his ranch mostly for growing crops. His main crops were lima beans, barley, corn, alfalfa, walnuts, and citrus.

According to Carol Yung, some of the land that Camarillo owned was in the Mission Oaks and Leisure Village area of the city that now bears his name. After his death in 1958, the land went to his family. Financial problems arose after some family deaths, so parcels of land were sold off due to taxes and land was given to St. John Seminary.

The 4.5-acre (18,000 m^{2}) property, including the barn and stable adjacent to the ranch house, was given to the city of Camarillo in 1997. The city relocated the buildings to their current locations on the ranch in 1999, and restored the exterior and foundation of the Camarillo Ranch House in 1999–2000. This renovation included upgrades, exterior lighting, and a ranch-style fence around the perimeter as well as a new roof and utilities. About $1.5 million and over 10,000 volunteered hours were invested. In 2001 the Camarillo Ranch House was opened to the public. Today, the city of Camarillo funds basic maintenance. The Camarillo Ranch Foundation has restored the entire interior of the house. This was done with donations and support from volunteers in the community. The foundation worked on matching specific styles of the rooms to match what they could have looked like when Camarillo and his family lived there.

=== Camarillo Ranch Foundation ===
In 1998 the Camarillo Ranch Foundation was established by the city of Camarillo. The foundation was recognized as a non-profit public corporation.

The Camarillo Ranch's mission statement includes:

"To preserve, restore, and maintain The Camarillo Ranch as a historic site in partnership with our public and private sectors, on a self-sustaining basis; to foster its place in the rich history of California; to transform it into a focal point of the community for education, enrichment, and enjoyment; and to exhibit our diverse history and culture".

=== Events at the Ranch House ===
According to Michael Lavenant, a board member from 2001 to 2011, the Camarillo Ranch House is available for weddings, receptions, bar mitzvahs, filming and corporate events. Among many of the events hosted here each year, weddings are the biggest source of income for the ranch.

The restored barn is also host to many events. For example, on May 20, 2010, Republican gubernatorial nominee Meg Whitman came to the Camarillo Ranch House for a campaign event to discuss immigration and education. Additionally, the ranch each year hosts two major fund raisers for the house: the Candle Light Gala and the Octoberfest Car Show.

=== Legal battles over Camarillo Ranch House ===
In 1891, Martina Camarillo deeded the ranch to her sons. Following her death, her daughters, who had only been given $5 each, challenged the will and the deed of the ranch. The daughters also claimed that their brothers had deceived their mother and that Juan Jr. had confessed his guilt to one of the sisters and paid her $8,500. Juan Jr., however, testified that his sisters were trying to blackmail him and send him to jail for an "infamous crime." Eventually Adolfo Camarillo was granted control over the ranch.
