= Bryan Anger =

American football player (born 1988)

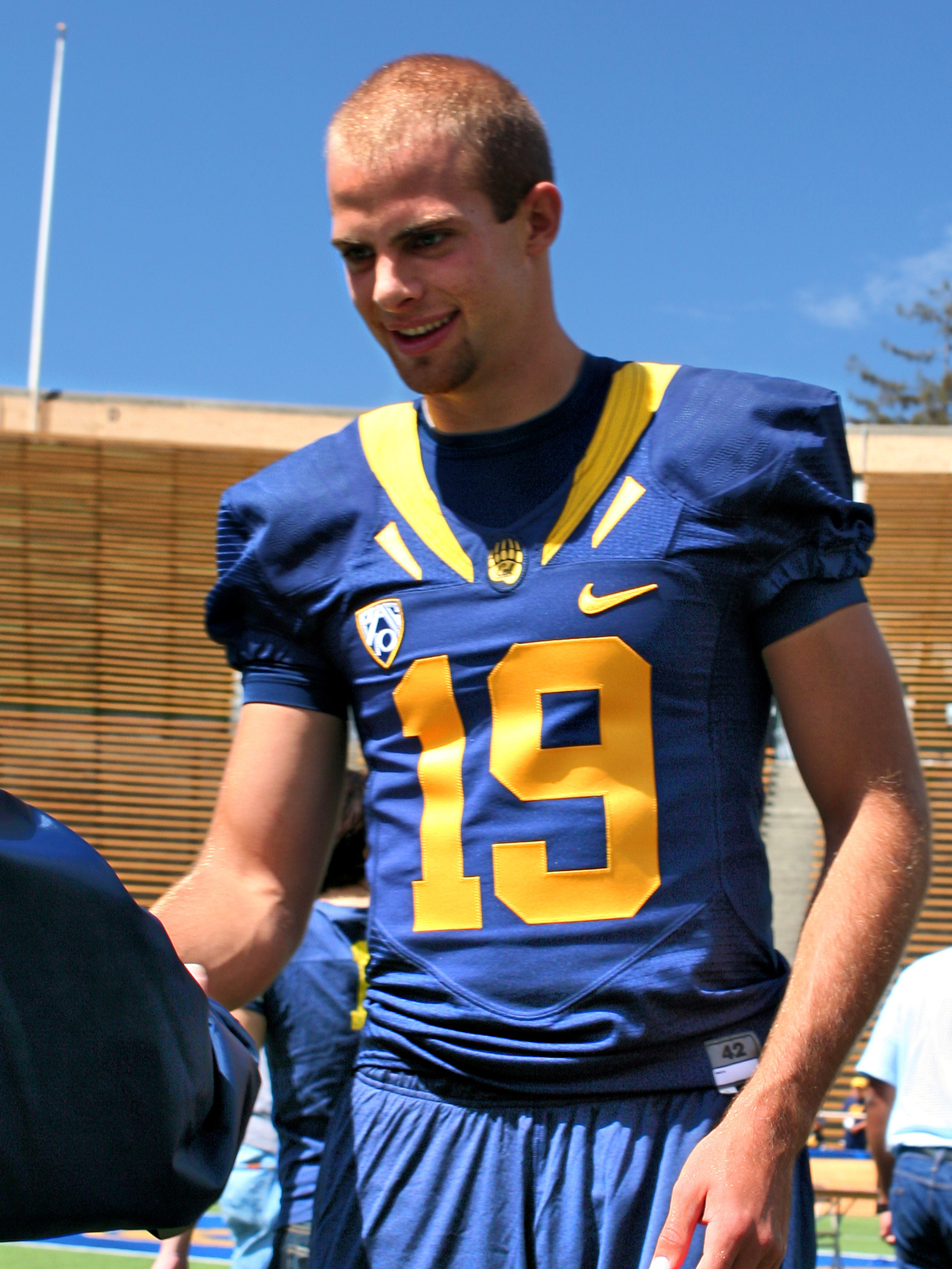
- Anger with the California Golden Bears in 2010

No. 5 – Dallas Cowboys
- Position: Punter
- Roster status: Active

Personal information
- Born: October 6, 1988 (age 38); Camarillo, California, U.S.
- Listed height: 6 ft 3 in (1.91 m)
- Listed weight: 214 lb (97 kg)

Career information
- High school: Camarillo
- College: California (2007–2011)
- NFL draft: 2012: 3rd round, 70th overall pick

Career history
- Jacksonville Jaguars (2012–2015); Tampa Bay Buccaneers (2016–2018); Houston Texans (2019–2020); Dallas Cowboys (2021–present)

Awards and highlights
- 2× Second-team All-Pro (2021, 2023); 2× Pro Bowl (2021, 2023); NFL punting yards leader (2013); PFWA All-Rookie Team (2012); 3× First-team All-Pac-10 (2009–2011); Second-team All-Pac-10 (2008); NFL record: Highest average punting yards in a rookie season: 47.84 (2012) (Note: Among qualified players)

Career NFL statistics as of Week 10, 2026
- Punts: 957
- Punting yards: 45,001
- Punting average: 47.0
- Longest punt: 83
- Inside 20: 352
- Stats at Pro Football Reference

Bryan Corey Anger (born October 6, 1988) is an American professional football punter for the Dallas Cowboys of the National Football League (NFL). He played college football for the California Golden Bears and was selected by the Jacksonville Jaguars in the third round of the 2012 NFL draft. Anger has also played for the Tampa Bay Buccaneers and Houston Texans.

== Early life ==
Bryan Corey Anger was born on October 6, 1988, in Camarillo, California. Anger attended Camarillo High School. As a senior, he posted a 41.8-yard average, 11 punts downed inside the 20-yard line, and 42 receptions for 678 yards and six touchdowns. Anger received SA Today All-American, EA Sports All-American, All-Far West team by SuperPrep, Prepstar All-West Region and Cal-Hi Sports first-team All-State honors. He was listed as the No. 2 punter in the country by Rivals.

== College career ==
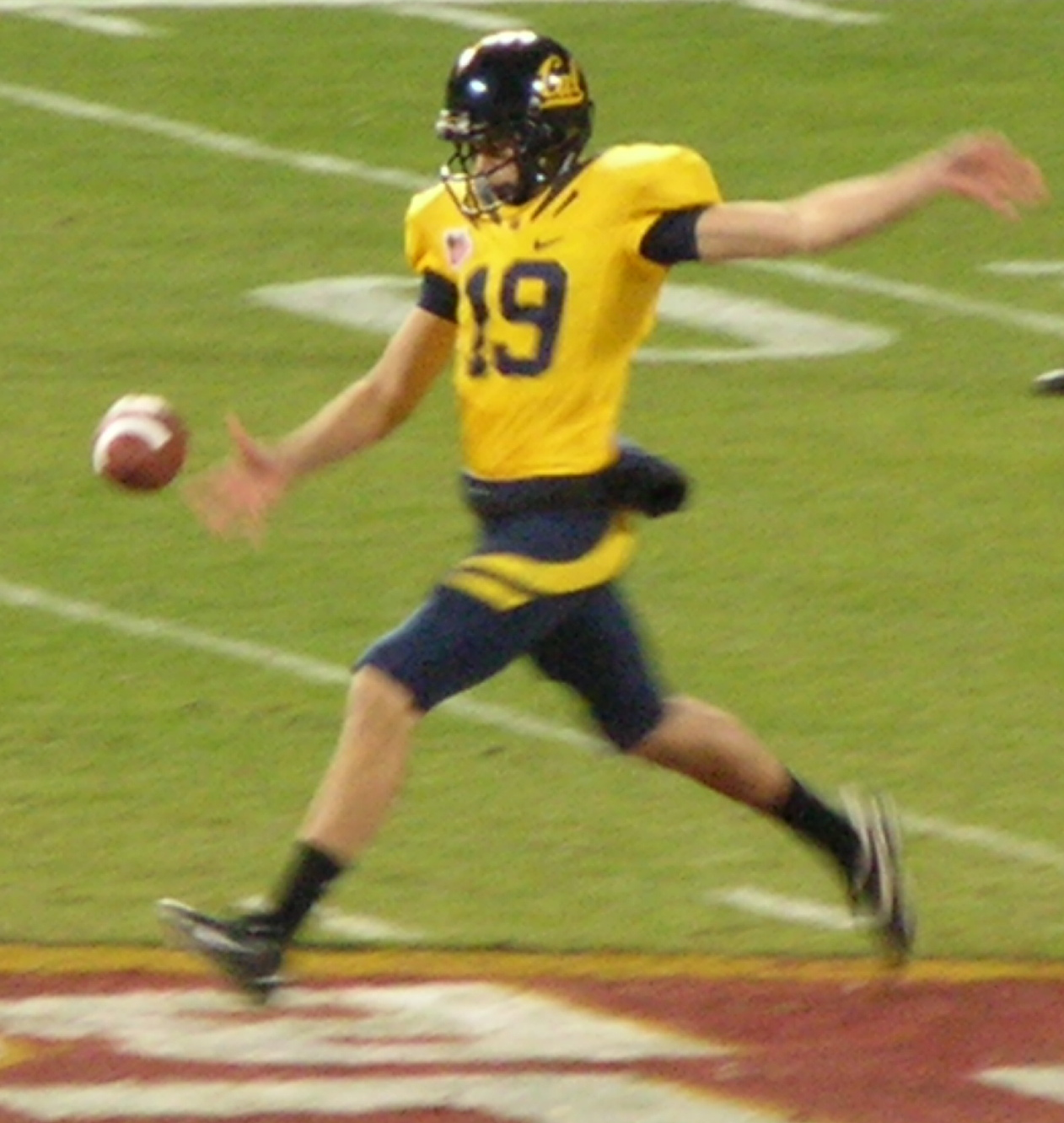
Anger with the California Golden Bears in 2008

Anger accepted a football scholarship from the University of California, Berkeley.

As a redshirt freshman, Anger registered a 43.1-yard punt average (sixth in school history) and had 26 punts downed inside the 20. Against Stanford University, he hit a 75-yard punt (tied for fifth in school history) and a career-long 76-yard punt (fourth in school history). Against Arizona State University, Anger hit a 72-yard punt. Against Arizona, he averaged 48.4 yards on seven attempts. Against Michigan State University, Anger had a blocked punt.

As a junior, Anger set the school single-season record for punt average (45.6 yards), ranking second in the Pac-10 and sixth nationally.

As a senior, Anger recorded a 44.2 punt average (fifth in school history). He finished second in school history and sixth in Pac-12 conference history in career gross punting average. Anger became the second player in school history to receive first-team all-conference honors for three consecutive seasons, matching Alex Mack's (2006–08) achievement. Anger was invited to the 2012 East–West Shrine Game, where he averaged 60.0 yards per punt on three attempts for the West team.

In four years, Anger never missed a game (51), totaling 255 punts for 11,094 yards, 72 punts of 50 or more yards, 90 punts downed inside the 20, a 43.5 average and a 38.2 net average.

== Professional career ==
Pre-draft measurables
Height	Weight	Arm length	Hand span	Wingspan
6 ft 3 5/8 in (1.92 m)	208 lb (94 kg)	33 1/4 in (0.84 m)	9 1/8 in (0.23 m)	6 ft 6 1/8 in (1.98 m)
All values from NFL Combine

=== Jacksonville Jaguars ===
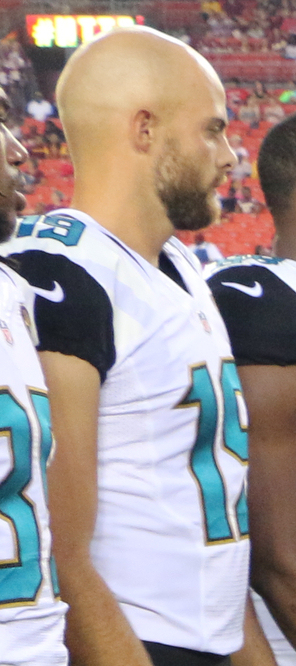
Anger with the Jacksonville Jaguars in 2015

Anger was selected by the Jacksonville Jaguars in the third round (70th overall) of the 2012 NFL draft. He became the highest drafted punter since Todd Sauerbrun was chosen 56th overall in 1995, and the first punter drafted by the Jaguars since 2007. On April 29, 2012, the Jaguars cut punters Nick Harris and Spencer Lanning. Like Anger, Harris also played collegiately at California.

As a rookie, Anger punted 91 times for 4,353 yards and a 47.8 average. His 47.8 yards per punt was second in the league. Anger was named to All-Rookie teams by CBS Sports, ESPN, Pro Football Weekly and many other media outlets. Anger also received a vote for the 2012 All-Pro Team as voted on by the Associated Press.

In 2013, Anger punted 95 times for 4,338 yards and a 45.66 average. He also led the league in punts and punting yards with 95 and 4,338, respectively.

In 2014, Anger punted 94 times for a career-high 4,464 yards and a league-leading 47.5 average. His 4,464 punting yards ranked second in the league that year.

In 2015, Anger punted 80 times for 3,700 yards and a 46.3 average.

=== Tampa Bay Buccaneers ===
On March 22, 2016, Anger signed a one-year contract with the Tampa Bay Buccaneers. Anger won the starting punting job after the team released Jake Schum.

On December 31, 2016, Anger signed a five-year, $17 million contract extension with the Buccaneers through the 2021 season. The following day against the Carolina Panthers in the regular-season finale, he punted five times for 229 yards and landed all five punts inside the 20-yard line as the Buccaneers narrowly won by a score of 17-16. He was named NFC Special Teams Player of the Week for his performance. Anger finished the 2016 season with 70 punts for 3,215 yards for a 45.93 average.

In the 2017 season, Anger had 65 punts for 2,857 yards for a 43.95 average.

In the 2018 season, Anger had 57 punts for 2,567 for a 45.04 average.

On March 13, 2019, Anger was released by the Buccaneers.

=== Houston Texans ===
On July 23, 2019, Anger signed with the Houston Texans. On August 30, 2019, Anger was released. However, he was re-signed on September 17, 2019 after the team cut Trevor Daniel.

On December 28, 2019, Anger was signed to a three-year contract extension. He finished the season with 45 punts for 2,094 yards.

In the 2020 season, Anger had 54 punts for 2,505 for a 46.38 average.

On March 18, 2021, Anger was released by the Texans.

=== Dallas Cowboys ===
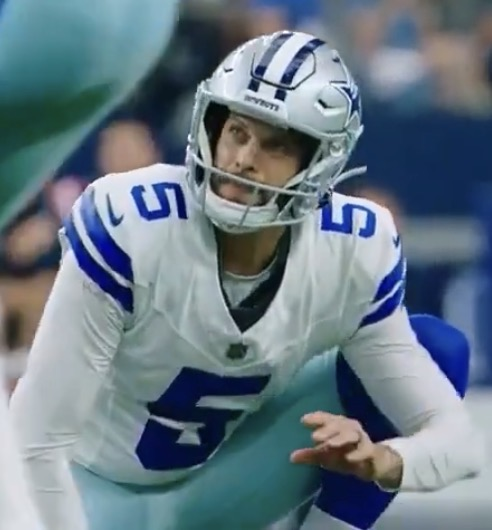
Anger with the Dallas Cowboys in 2023

On April 7, 2021, Anger signed a one-year contract with the Dallas Cowboys.

After punting 65 times for 3,143 yards and a 48.4 average in the 2021 season, Anger was named for the 2022 Pro Bowl, his first selection. He was also named second-team All-Pro. In the Wild Card round against the San Francisco 49ers, Anger punted five times for 268 yards and had a 16-yard completion in the 23-17 loss.

On March 22, 2022, Anger re-signed with the Cowboys on a three-year, $9 million contract. He finished the 2022 season with 68 punts for 3,291 yards and a 48.4 average.

Anger finished the 2023 season with 44 punts for 2,262 yards and a 51.41 average.

In the 2024 season, Anger punted 62 times for 3,005 yards for a 48.5 average. In the 2025 season, he punted 41 times for 1,994 yards for a 48.6 average.

== Career statistics ==
=== NFL ===
Legend
	Led the league
**Bold**	Career high

==== Regular season ====
Year	Team	GP	Punting				
Year	Team	GP	Punts	Yds	Avg	Lng	Blk
2012	JAX	16	91	4,353	47.8	73	1
2013	JAX	16	**95**	4,338	45.7	61	0
2014	JAX	16	94	**4,464**	47.5	69	**2**
2015	JAX	16	80	3,700	46.3	63	0
2016	TB	16	70	3,215	45.9	59	0
2017	TB	16	65	2,857	44.0	62	1
2018	TB	16	57	2,567	44.1	64	1
2019	HOU	14	45	2,094	46.5	71	0
2020	HOU	16	54	2,505	46.4	67	0
2021	DAL	**17**	65	3,143	48.4	63	0
2022	DAL	**17**	68	3,291	48.4	**83**	0
2023	DAL	**17**	44	2,262	**51.4**	63	0
2024	DAL	**17**	62	3,005	48.5	62	0
2025	DAL	**17**	41	1,994	48.6	65	0
2026	DAL	10	26	1,213	46.7	60	0
Career		237	957	45,001	47.0	83	5

==== Postseason ====
Year	Team	GP	Punting				
Year	Team	GP	Punts	Yds	Avg	Lng	Blk
2019	HOU	**2**	**8**	353	44.1	56	0
2021	DAL	1	5	268	**53.6**	**59**	0
2022	DAL	**2**	**8**	**376**	47.0	56	0
2023	DAL	1	2	80	40.0	40	0
Career		6	23	1,077	46.8	59	0

=== College ===
**Year**	**School**	**Conf**	**Class**	**Pos**	**G**	**Punts**	**Yds**	**Avg**
2008	California	Pac-10	FR	P	13	71	3,063	43.1
2009	California	Pac-10	SO	P	13	69	2,861	41.5
2010	California	Pac-10	JR	P	12	62	2,825	45.6
2011	California	Pac-12	SR	P	13	53	2,345	44.2
**Career**	**California**					**255**	**11,094**	**43.5**

== Personal life ==
Shortly after Anger was selected by the Jaguars, NFL Network host Rich Eisen exclaimed, "Punters are people too!" Eisen had Anger as a guest on his podcast and presented him with a shirt containing that exclamation. Nevertheless, the Jaguars have received much criticism from fans and football experts for drafting a punter ahead of future Super Bowl winning quarterback Russell Wilson, although the Jaguars publicly said that they never considered drafting Wilson due to having 2011 first-round pick Blaine Gabbert.

Due to his powerful leg, Anger's Jacksonville teammates gave him the nickname Banger.
