= Western Foundation of Vertebrate Zoology =

US non-profit organization

The WFVZ Bird Museum and Research Center (formerly Western Foundation of Vertebrate Zoology) (WFVZ) is a non-profit charitable organization based in Camarillo, California, focused on research and education on bird conservation. It hosts a natural history collection of over 250,000 sets of bird eggs with data, around 20,000 nests, and over 58,000 bird study skins from around the world.

It published a journal, the Proceedings of the Western Foundation of Vertebrate Zoology (ISSN 0511-7550) until 2010.

== See also ==
- John R. Cruttenden
