= Jeff Tackett =

American baseball player (born 1965)

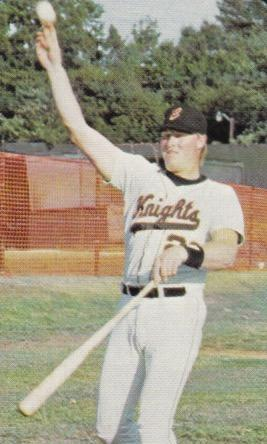
- Tackett with the Charlotte Knights c. 1988
- Catcher
- Born: December 1, 1965 (age 60); Fresno, California, U.S.
- Batted: Right Threw: Right

MLB debut
- September 11, 1991, for the Baltimore Orioles

Last MLB appearance
- August 2, 1994, for the Baltimore Orioles

MLB statistics
- Batting average: .217
- Home runs: 7
- Runs Batted In: 42
- Stats at Baseball Reference

Teams
- Baltimore Orioles (1991–1994)

Jeffrey Wilson Tackett (born December 1, 1965) is an American former professional baseball catcher. He played in Major League Baseball for the Baltimore Orioles from 1991 to 1994. A career .217 hitter, Tackett was more renowned for his defensive skills behind the plate than for his hitting. He also made cameos as himself in the films Bob Roberts and Dave, the latter he caught the ceremonial first pitch thrown by the president.

He went to Dos Caminos grade school and Los Altos Middle School, and was a 1984 graduate of Adolfo Camarillo High School in Camarillo, California, the school at which his father Terry became the principal.

Tackett is one of a number of baseball players on the list of Major League Baseball players with a home run in their final major league at bat.
