= Pleasant Valley School District (California) =

School district in Ventura County, California

Location
- 600 Temple Ave. Camarillo, California 93010 United States

District information
- Grades: P-12
- Established: November 10, 1868; 156 years ago
- Superintendent: Danielle Cortes
- Schools: 14

Students and staff
- Students: 5,808
- Student–teacher ratio: 21:1

Other information
- Website: www.pleasantvalleysd.org

The Pleasant Valley School District (PVSD) is a K-12 public school district based in Camarillo, California, United States. It is the oldest continuously operated school district in Ventura County. As of the 2022-23 school year, 5,808 students were enrolled in PVSD schools.

== Schools ==
School	Enrollment (as of the 2022-23 school year)	Grades
Preschool Early Education Program PEEP	No data available.	Pre-K
Dos Caminos Elementary	302	K-5
Camarillo Heights STEM Academy	365	K-5
Las Posas Elementary	456	K-5
La Mariposa	555	K-5
Tierra Linda Elementary	561	K-5
Rancho Rosal Elementary	576	K-5
Monte Vista Middle	680	6-8
Las Colinas Middle	735	6-8
Santa Rosa Technology Magnet	484	K-8
Pleasant Valley School of Engineering and Arts	536	K-8
Los Primeros School of Sciences and Arts	556	K-8
University Preparation Charter School at CSU Channel Islands	722	K-8
Peak Prep Pleasant Valley	No data available.	K-12

All of PVSD's campuses have physical locations, excepting Peak Prep, a school which is entirely virtual.
