= Rancho Calleguas =

Mexican land grant in Ventura County, California

Coordinates: 34.220°N 119.010°W

Rancho Calleguas was a 9,998-acre (40.46 km^{2}) Mexican land grant in present-day Ventura County, California given in 1837 by Governor Juan Alvarado to José Pedro Ruiz.

The grant was south of Rancho Las Posas, east of Rancho El Rio de Santa Clara o la Colonia, north of the Rancho Guadalasca, and west of Rancho El Conejo. It encompassed the Santa Rosa Valley and present-day Camarillo.

== History ==
José Pedro Ruiz (1776–1849) came to California with his father, Efigeno Ruiz, who was a soldier with the 1781 Rivera expedition. José Pedro Ruiz married María Ygnacia Lugo, and was granted Rancho Calleguas in 1837. José Pedro Ruiz died in 1849, and his son, José Gabriel Ruiz (1817–), inherited the rancho.

With the cession of California to the United States following the Mexican-American War, the 1848 Treaty of Guadalupe Hidalgo provided that the land grants would be honored. As required by the Land Act of 1851, a claim for Rancho Calleguas was filed with the Public Land Commission in 1852, and the grant was patented to José Gabriel Ruiz et al. in 1866.

José Gabriel Ruiz sold the rancho to Juan Camarillo in 1876. Juan Camarillo (1812–1880) came to California with the Híjar-Padrés Colony in 1834. In 1857, Camarillo moved from Santa Barbara and opened a merchandise store in what is now Ventura. Successful in business, Juan Camarillo began to invest in land, including the purchase of Rancho Ojai in 1856.

Juan Camarillo died in 1880. He was survived by his wife, four daughters and two sons. Rancho Calleguas, was willed to his widow Martina (1826–1898). Martina willed her entire interest in Rancho Calleguas to her sons, Adolfo (1864–1958) and Juan, Jr. (1867–1936). Their sisters had received other properties on the father's death. It was Juan Camarillo's sons, Adolfo and Juan, who are credited with the founding of the town that was to bear their name.

== Historic sites of the Rancho ==
- Camarillo Ranch House. Queen Anne style house was built in 1892 by Adolfo Camarillo.
