= Camarillo, California =

City in California, United States

- City
- City of Camarillo
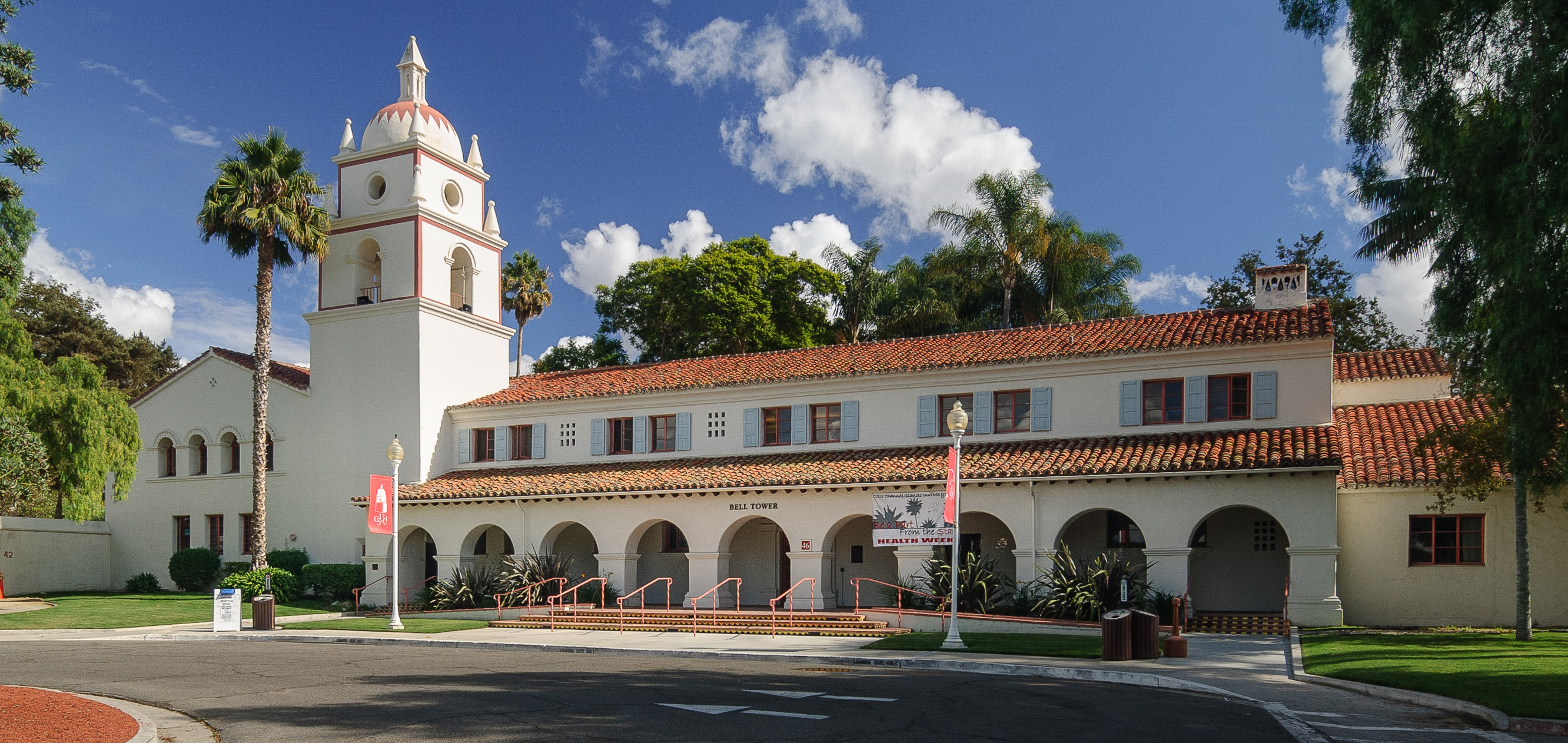
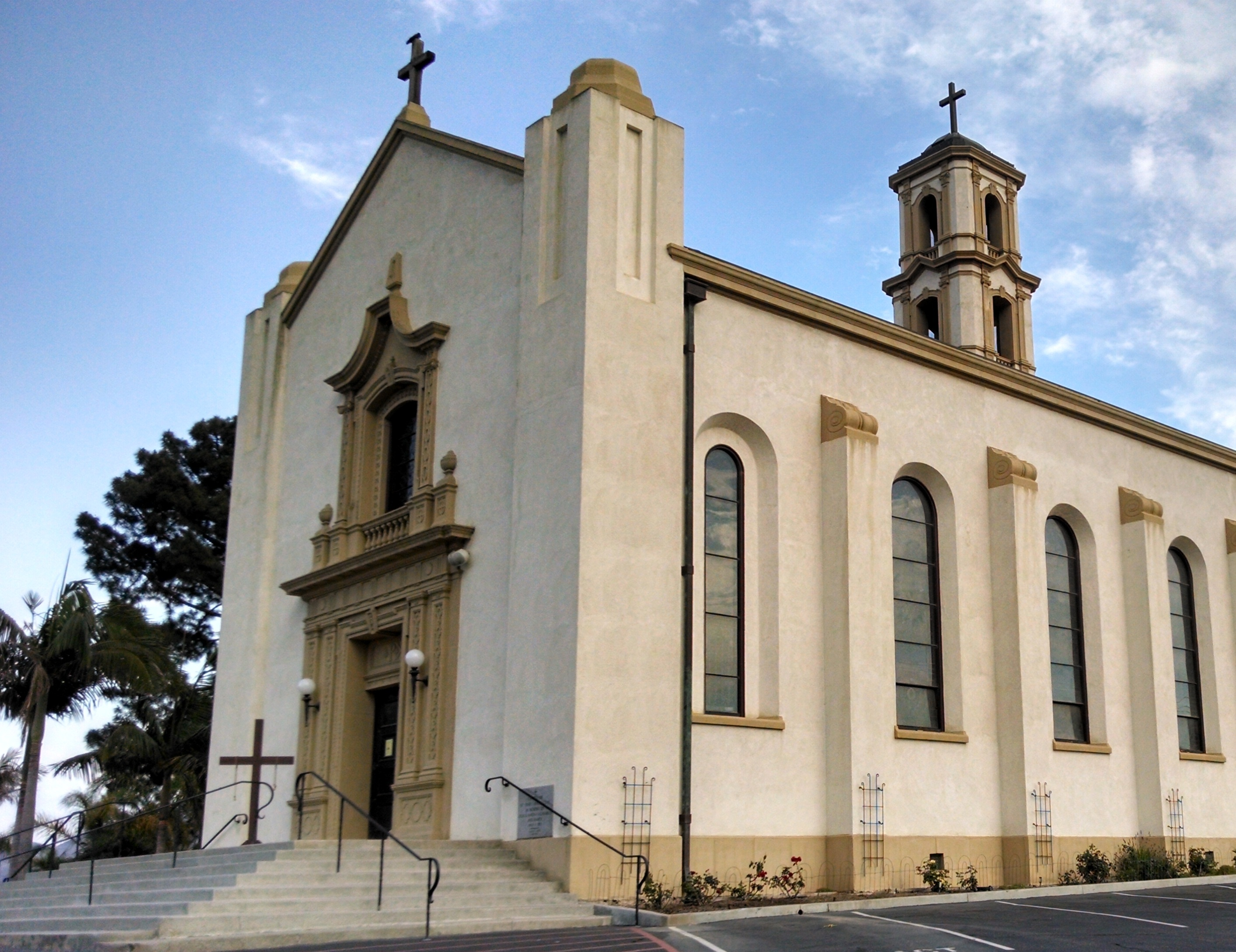
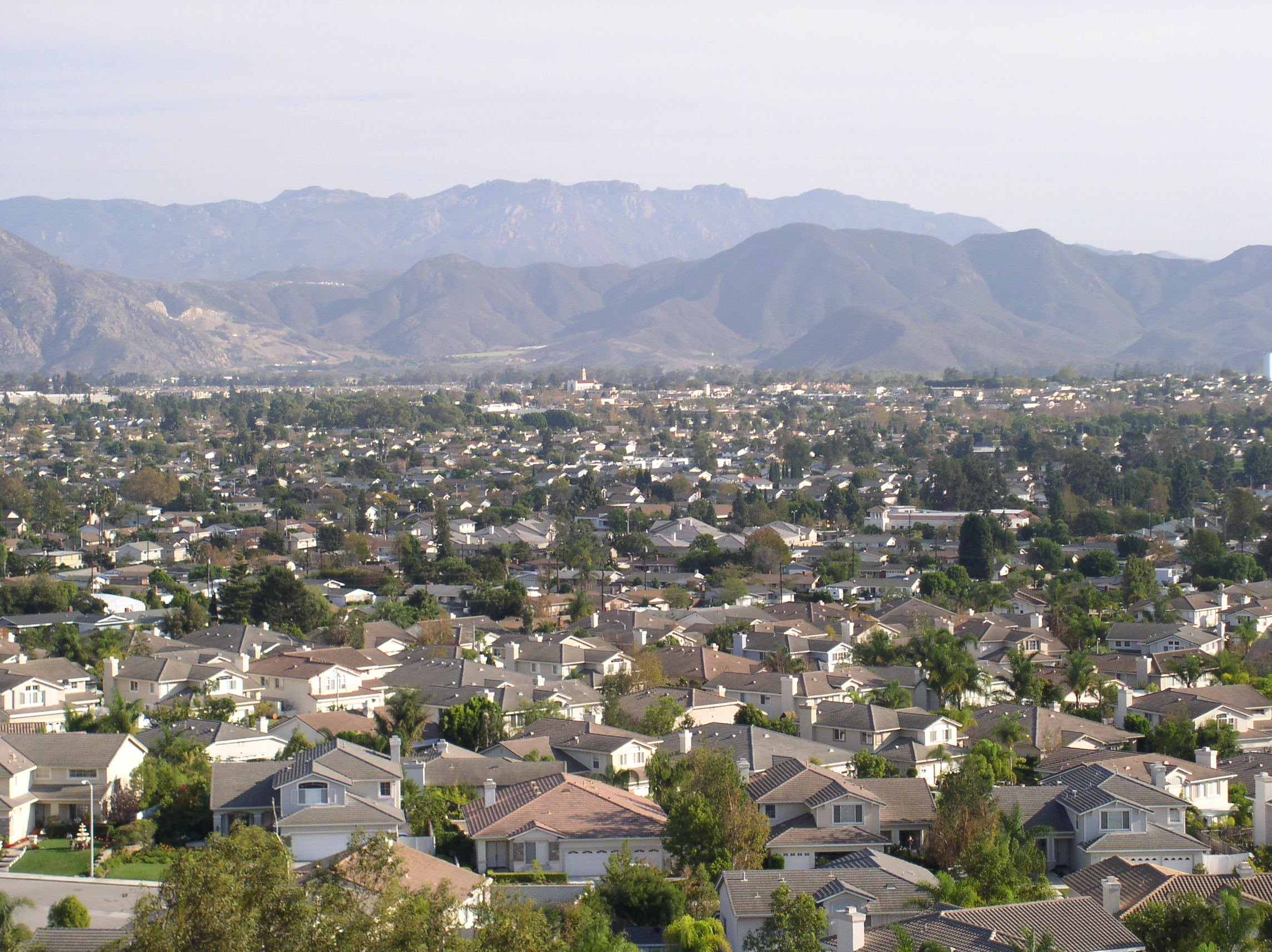
- Clockwise: California State University Channel Islands; view of Camarillo; St. Mary Magdalene Chapel

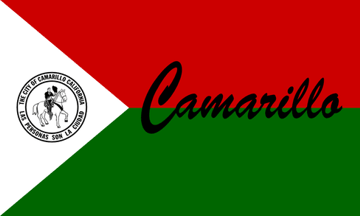
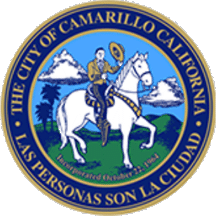
- Flag Seal Logo
- Motto: "Las Personas Son la Ciudad" ("The People Are the City")
- Interactive map of Camarillo, California
- Location within California Location within the United States
- Coordinates: 34°14′N 119°2′W
- Country: United States
- State: California
- County: Ventura
- Rail station: 1898
- Incorporated: October 22, 1964
- Named for: Adolfo and Juan Camarillo

Government
  - Mayor District 1: David Tennessen (term ends in 2026)
  - Vice Mayor District 5: Martita Martinez-Bravo (term ends in 2026)
  - City Council District 2: Susan Santangelo (term ends in 2026)
  - City Council District 3: Kevin Kildee (term ends in 2028)
  - City Council District 4: Tony Trembley (term ends in 2028)
  - County supervisor: Kelly Long

Area
  - Total: 19.70 sq mi (51.03 km^{2})
  - Land: 19.69 sq mi (50.99 km^{2})
  - Water: 0.015 sq mi (0.04 km^{2}) 0.08%
- Elevation: 177 ft (54 m)

Population (2020)
  - Total: 70,741
  - Density: 3,593.5/sq mi (1,387.45/km^{2})
- Time zone: UTC−8 (PST)
  - Summer (DST): UTC−7 (PDT)
- ZIP Codes: 93010–93012
- Area code: 805
- FIPS code: 06-10046
- GNIS feature IDs: 1652682, 2409966
- Website: www.cityofcamarillo.org

Camarillo (/ˌkæməˈriːoʊ/ KAM-ə-REE-oh) is a city in Ventura County, California, United States. As of the 2020 United States census, the population was 70,741, an increase of 5,540 from the 65,201 counted in the 2010 Census. Camarillo is named for brothers Juan Camarillo, Jr. and Adolfo Camarillo, prominent Californios who owned Rancho Calleguas and founded the city. California State University Channel Islands is housed on the former grounds of the Camarillo State Mental Hospital.

== History ==
=== Chumash era ===
At the time of European contact in the 18th century, Camarillo had been inhabited by the Chumash people for thousands of years.

Present day Camarillo and the larger Oxnard Plain were portions of a paramount Chumash capital at the village of Muwu (today's Point Mugu). Simo'mo (CA-VEN-24), which translates to "the saltbush patch", was a Chumash village located upstream from Mugu Lagoon near the city of Camarillo. Caves with ancient pictographs are located in the area around Conejo Grade including a site used for religious ceremonies dating back to 500 A.D., where two Chumash villages were located: Lalimanux (Lalimanuc or Lalimanuh) and Kayɨwɨš or Kayiwish (Kawyis) (CA-VEN-243). The village of Kayɨwɨš (Chumash: "The Head") was first encountered by Europeans of the first Portolá expedition on August 16, 1795.

=== Spanish and Mexican era ===
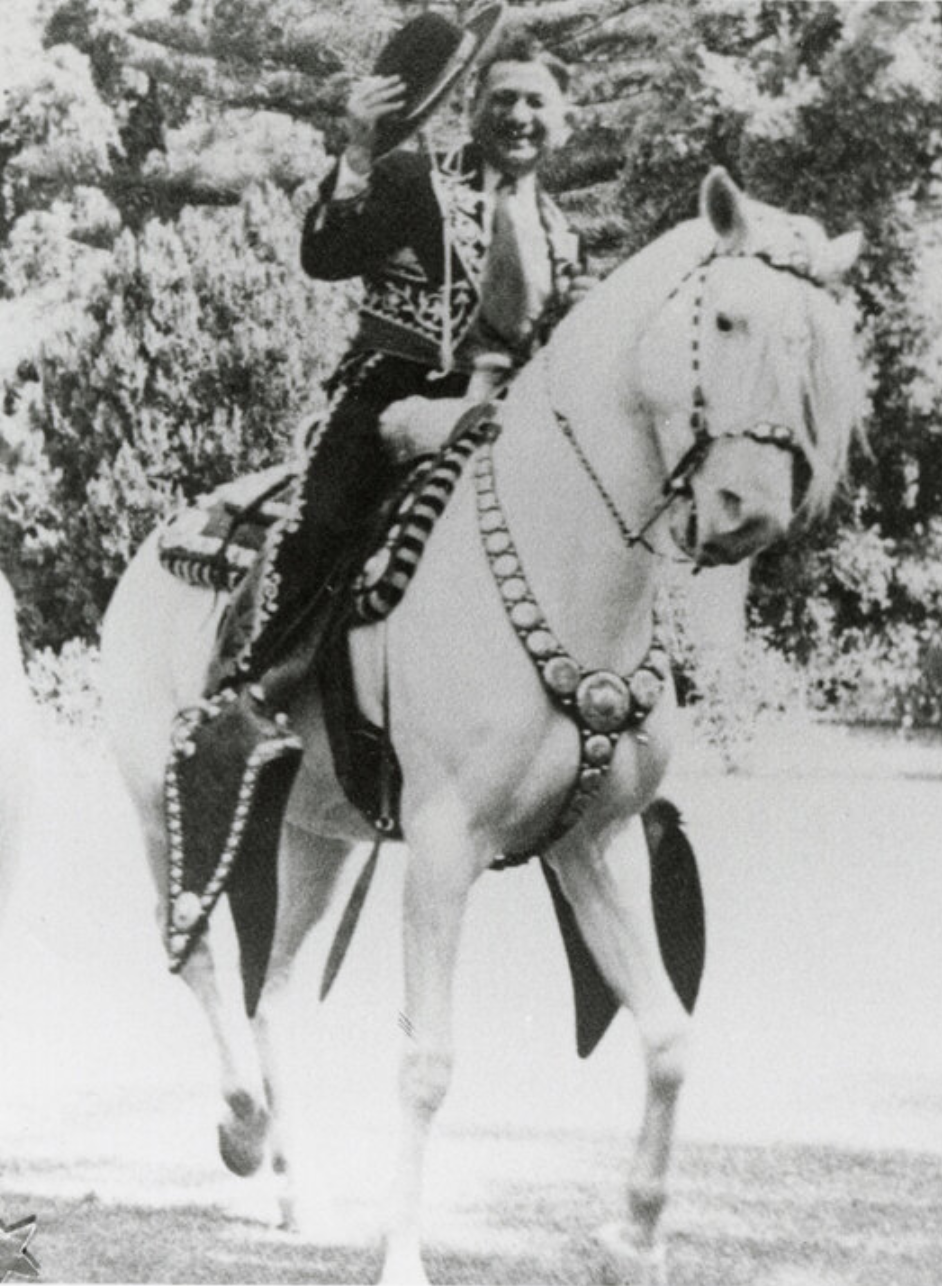
Camarillo is named after Californio brothers Adolfo Camarillo (pictured) and Juan Camarillo Jr., who founded the city on their Rancho Calleguas.

By the early 1820s, Mexico had gained independence from Spain, and shortly afterward California allied itself with Mexico. The Mexican land grant system was liberalized in 1824, resulting in many large grants in California and the proliferation of Ranchos north of the border. One grant to José Pedro Ruiz created Rancho Calleguas in 1837, in the area that is now Camarillo. The grant was later sold to Juan Camarillo, who had arrived in 1834 as a member of the Híjar-Padrés colony; his sons, Adolfo and Juan, began developing a ranch on the Pleasant Valley area of the vast fertile Oxnard Plain.

=== Early 20th century ===
Around 1910, the area for the original town site of Camarillo was beginning to be laid out. The town was centered around St. Mary Magdalen Church, which was to serve as the family chapel for Adolfo Camarillo. In 1927 Don Juan Camarillo, brother of Adolfo, donated 100 acres (0.40 km^{2}) to be used as a seminary to be named in honor of Saint John the Evangelist. The Roman Catholic seminary was opened in 1939 as St. John's Seminary.

Camarillo's growth was slow from its founding through World War II. In the late 1940s, building lots on Ventura Boulevard, the main downtown street, were being offered for $450 and home lots on the adjoining streets were $250, with few buyers. Travel to and from Los Angeles was difficult, owing to the narrow, tortuous road climbing the Conejo Grade to the east of the city.

The main industry during this period was agriculture, and the area surrounding the small town was blanketed with orange, lemon and walnut groves. The State Mental hospital, that was built south of the town, was the largest employer. A few houses had sprung up to the north and south of the town center. The Oxnard Army Air Field, built during World War II to the west of town, the Naval Air Facility at Point Mugu and the Seabee base at Port Hueneme brought many military personnel to the area, but there was little private industry or other source of non-agricultural employment.

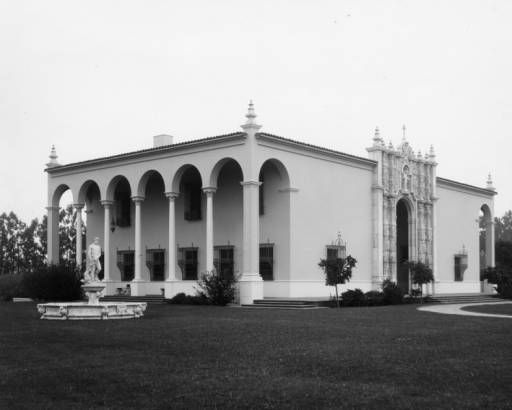
St. John's Seminary was built on land donated by Juan Camarillo Jr. from his Rancho Calleguas in 1927.

Oxnard AAF closed at the end of World War II, but the Navy facilities remained open, with the airfield upgraded to Naval Air Station Point Mugu and the Seabee base becoming Naval Construction Battalion Center Port Hueneme and Naval Surface Warfare Center Port Hueneme. With the Korean War and associated Cold War tensions, the former Oxnard AAF was reactivated in 1951 as Oxnard Air Force Base, an Air Defense Command / Aerospace Defense Command fighter-interceptor base, that closed again in 1970 and became the present-day Camarillo Airport.

In the mid-1950s, the Ventura Freeway was completed from Los Angeles to points north, making it an easy one-hour trip to Camarillo. The Old Town was bisected by the Ventura Freeway. On the southern side of the freeway contains a strip of businesses, churches, schools, and parks. The freeway was originally planned to follow the path of Potrero Road, south of Camarillo, which would have completely by-passed the soon-to-be city. However, after much debate, city officials persuaded Caltrans to lay the freeway parallel to Ventura Boulevard, creating the infamously steep descent from the Santa Monica Mountains, known as the Conejo Grade. The grade is about 2.7 miles (4.3 km) and posted as a 7% grade—which translates as about one thousand feet of elevation change in less than three miles (70 meters per kilometer). There is a California Highway Patrol brake inspection station at the top of the grade and a stop is mandatory for all 18-wheel trucks. The completion of the freeway facilitated the growth that followed. In 1962, the population was 7,500 and 3M began construction for the Mincom and Magnetic Tape Divisions, which would ultimately employ 900 people, becoming the largest local employer. That plant briefly housed a factory for 3M spinoff Imation before being closed in 2008.

=== Incorporation ===
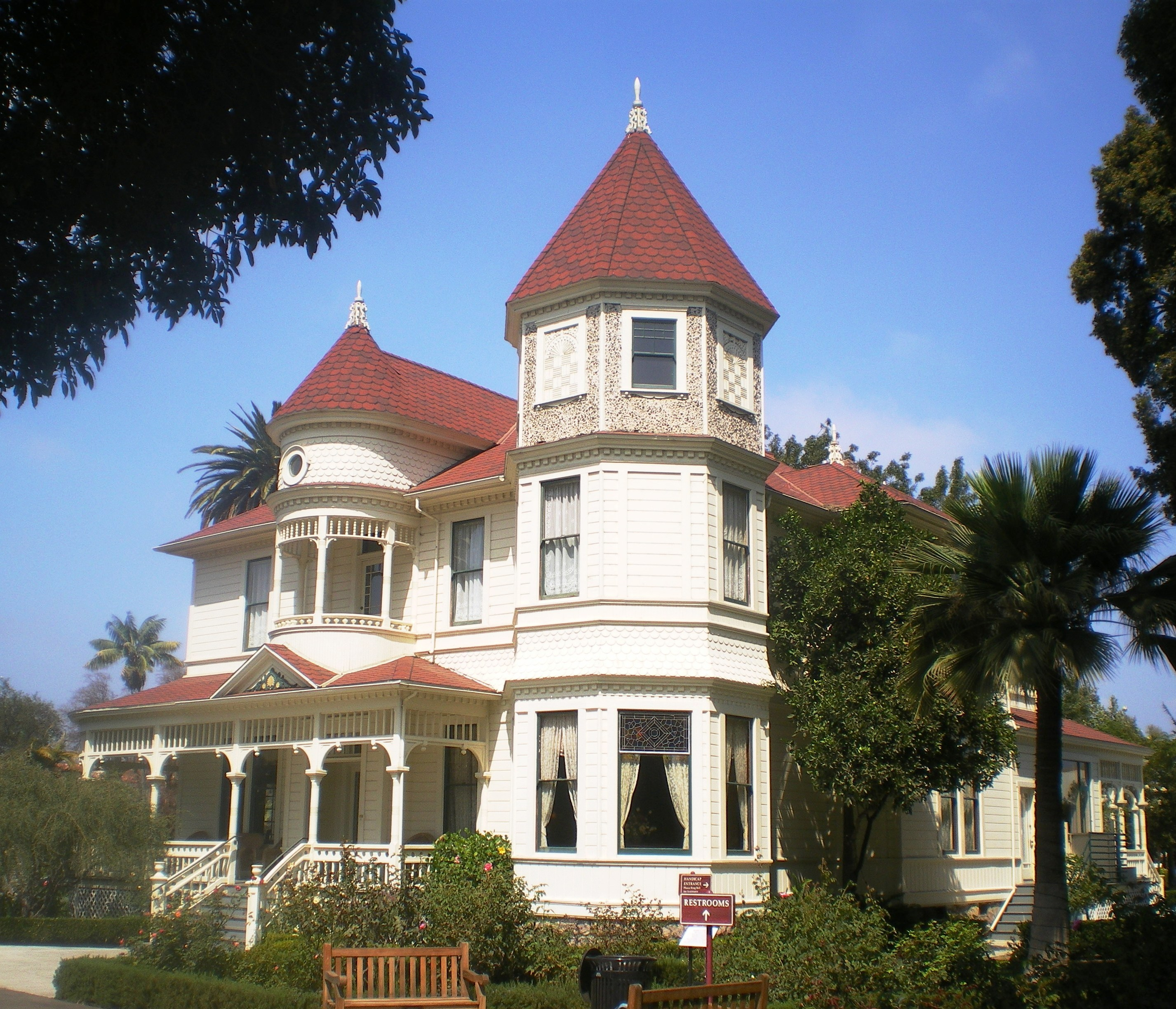
The Camarillo Ranch House, built by the Camarillo brothers on their Rancho Calleguas.

Plans were made for the incorporation of the city to control the rapid expansion. Camarillo became a city in 1964 and soon put into place a General Plan and building codes. In 1964 the closest traffic signal was 2 miles (3.2 km) from the city center on the road to Point Mugu, and the first shopping center and supermarket were under construction.

Many of the home buyers during the 1960s were military veterans, who had been stationed at one of the local bases. The temperate climate and the living conditions lured them back. With the establishment of both the Pacific Missile Range at NAS Point Mugu and the Naval Civil Engineering Laboratory at Port Hueneme, many found employment that utilized their military training. Other newcomers were those who worked and lived in the San Fernando Valley and were willing to endure the commute for the opportunity to raise their families in a smog-free, semirural environment. Others moved to Camarillo to retire in communities such as Leisure Village, which opened in 1973.

In 2014, the council voted against an 895-acre project (362 ha) that would have extended development on agricultural lands east towards the Conejo Grade.

Camarillo Springs Fire

Beginning 7:02 am. on Thursday, May 2, 2013, a major brush fire began in the Camarillo Springs area and burned throughout the area. The community of Dos Vientos and CSUCI were evacuated due to the proximity of the fire. Approximately 15 houses were damaged, with none fully destroyed. 28,000 acres of land was burned by the fire. On Sunday, May 5, 2013, rain in the area during the night helped firefighters bring the fire under full control.

2025 Immigration raid

On July 10, 2025, Immigration and Customs Enforcement agents and National Guard units used chemical munitions against protesters as they carried out immigration raids on a farm on the Oxnard Plain near Camarillo.

== Geography ==
According to the United States Census Bureau, the city has a total area of 19.7 square miles (51 km^{2}). 0.017 square miles (0.044 km^{2}) of the area (0.08%) is water.

Camarillo is located in Pleasant Valley at the eastern end of the Oxnard Plain, with the Santa Susana Mountains to the north, the Camarillo Hills to the northwest, the Conejo Valley to the east, and the western reaches of the Santa Monica Mountains to the south.

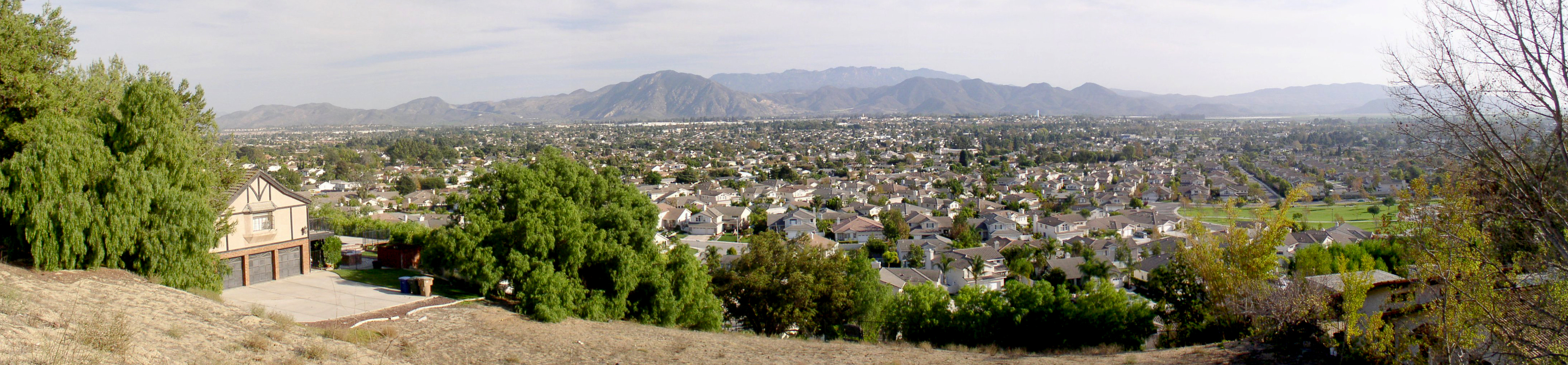
Panoramic view of Camarillo

=== Climate ===
This region experiences warm (sometimes hot) and dry summers, with no average monthly temperatures above 71.6 °F (22.0 °C). According to the Köppen Climate Classification system, Camarillo has a warm-summer Mediterranean climate, abbreviated "Csb" on climate maps.

Climate data for Camarillo, California, 1991–2020 normals, extremes 1923–present
Month	Jan	Feb	Mar	Apr	May	Jun	Jul	Aug	Sep	Oct	Nov	Dec	Year
Record high °F (°C)	94 (34)	91 (33)	97 (36)	100 (38)	102 (39)	102 (39)	101 (38)	97 (36)	108 (42)	108 (42)	99 (37)	94 (34)	108 (42)
Mean maximum °F (°C)	82.0 (27.8)	81.4 (27.4)	83.3 (28.5)	86.5 (30.3)	83.0 (28.3)	81.5 (27.5)	84.1 (28.9)	85.6 (29.8)	90.0 (32.2)	92.9 (33.8)	88.5 (31.4)	80.6 (27.0)	96.9 (36.1)
Mean daily maximum °F (°C)	68.0 (20.0)	67.6 (19.8)	68.5 (20.3)	71.0 (21.7)	71.9 (22.2)	74.7 (23.7)	78.0 (25.6)	79.5 (26.4)	79.6 (26.4)	76.4 (24.7)	72.8 (22.7)	67.7 (19.8)	73.0 (22.8)
Daily mean °F (°C)	56.5 (13.6)	56.6 (13.7)	58.0 (14.4)	60.1 (15.6)	62.3 (16.8)	65.9 (18.8)	69.1 (20.6)	70.2 (21.2)	69.5 (20.8)	65.2 (18.4)	60.7 (15.9)	55.8 (13.2)	62.5 (16.9)
Mean daily minimum °F (°C)	45.0 (7.2)	45.6 (7.6)	47.4 (8.6)	49.2 (9.6)	52.7 (11.5)	57.0 (13.9)	60.3 (15.7)	60.9 (16.1)	59.4 (15.2)	53.9 (12.2)	48.6 (9.2)	43.8 (6.6)	52.0 (11.1)
Mean minimum °F (°C)	36.2 (2.3)	36.7 (2.6)	39.1 (3.9)	42.0 (5.6)	47.0 (8.3)	50.9 (10.5)	54.5 (12.5)	54.6 (12.6)	52.2 (11.2)	46.6 (8.1)	39.5 (4.2)	35.3 (1.8)	33.9 (1.1)
Record low °F (°C)	25 (−4)	28 (−2)	30 (−1)	31 (−1)	34 (1)	37 (3)	42 (6)	43 (6)	40 (4)	35 (2)	28 (−2)	27 (−3)	25 (−4)
Average precipitation inches (mm)	2.85 (72)	2.90 (74)	2.00 (51)	0.64 (16)	0.33 (8.4)	0.13 (3.3)	0.02 (0.51)	0.00 (0.00)	0.06 (1.5)	0.50 (13)	0.87 (22)	1.71 (43)	12.01 (304.71)
Average precipitation days (≥ 0.01 in)	5.6	6.6	5.2	2.8	1.6	0.4	0.2	0.3	1.1	2.7	4.0	5.5	36.0
Source 1: NOAA
Source 2: National Weather Service

== Demographics ==
Historical population
Census	Pop.	Note	%±
1960	2,359		—
1970	19,219		714.7%
1980	37,797		96.7%
1990	52,303		38.4%
2000	57,077		9.1%
2010	65,201		14.2%
2020	70,741		8.5%
U.S. Decennial Census; 1850–1870 1880-1890; 1900 1910 1920; 1930 1940 1950; 1960 1970 1980; 1990 2000 2010

=== Racial and ethnic composition ===
Camarillo city, California – Racial and ethnic composition Note: the US Census treats Hispanic/Latino as an ethnic category. This table excludes Latinos from the racial categories and assigns them to a separate category. Hispanics/Latinos may be of any race.
Race / Ethnicity (NH = Non-Hispanic)	Pop 2000	Pop 2010	Pop 2020	% 2000	% 2010	% 2020
White alone (NH)	41,543	40,324	37,557	72.78%	61.85%	53.09%
Black or African American alone (NH)	802	1,106	1,524	1.41%	1.70%	2.15%
Native American or Alaska Native alone (NH)	201	139	131	0.35%	0.21%	0.19%
Asian alone (NH)	4,068	6,491	7,806	7.13%	9.96%	11.03%
Native Hawaiian or Pacific Islander alone (NH)	105	107	160	0.18%	0.16%	0.23%
Other race alone (NH)	86	115	429	0.15%	0.18%	0.61%
Mixed race or Multiracial (NH)	1,403	1,961	3,778	2.46%	3.01%	5.34%
Hispanic or Latino (any race)	8,869	14,958	19,356	15.54%	22.94%	27.36%
Total	57,077	65,201	70,741	100.00%	100.00%	100.00%

=== 2020 census ===
As of the 2020 census, Camarillo had a population of 70,741 and a population density of 3,593.5 inhabitants per square mile (1,387.5/km^{2}). The median age was 42.8 years. 20.4% of residents were under the age of 18, 8.1% were aged 18 to 24, 24.1% were aged 25 to 44, 25.9% were aged 45 to 64, and 21.6% were 65 years of age or older. For every 100 females, there were 92.5 males, and for every 100 females age 18 and over, there were 89.5 males.

The census reported that 99.3% of the population lived in households, 0.4% lived in non-institutionalized group quarters, and 0.3% were institutionalized. 99.9% of residents lived in urban areas, while 0.1% lived in rural areas.

There were 26,727 households, of which 29.7% had children under the age of 18 living in them. Of all households, 53.1% were married-couple households, 5.5% were cohabiting couple households, 14.6% were households with a male householder and no spouse or partner present, and 26.8% were households with a female householder and no spouse or partner present. About 24.6% of all households were made up of individuals, and 14.3% had someone living alone who was 65 years of age or older. The average household size was 2.63, and there were 18,476 families (69.1% of all households).

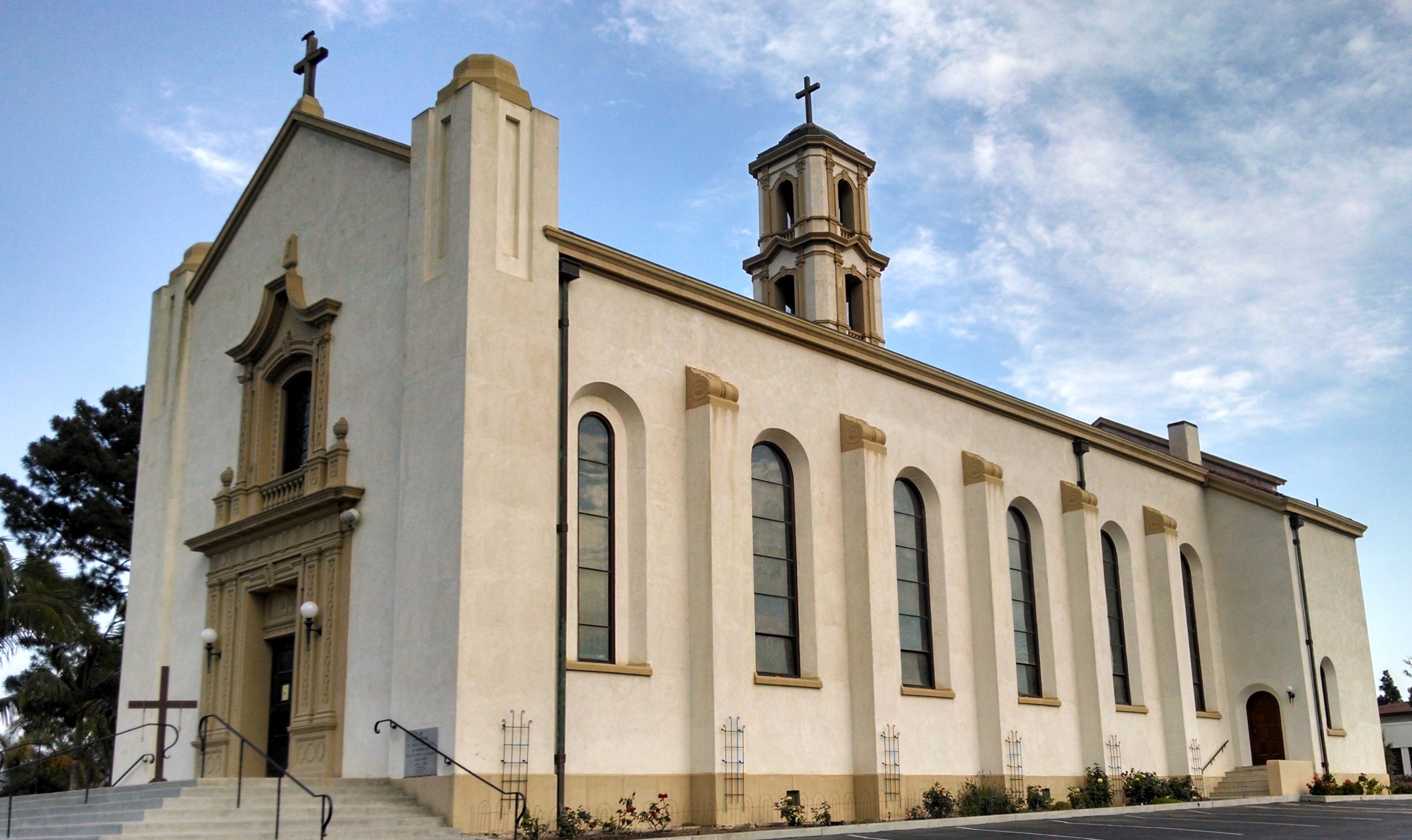
St. Mary Magdalene was founded by the Camarillo brothers and houses the Camarillo Family Mausoleum.

There were 27,828 housing units at an average density of 1,413.6 units per square mile (545.8 units/km^{2}), of which 4.0% were vacant and 96.0% were occupied. Of occupied units, 65.8% were owner-occupied and 34.2% were occupied by renters. The homeowner vacancy rate was 0.8%, and the rental vacancy rate was 5.0%.

Racial composition as of the 2020 census
Race	Number	Percent
White	42,176	59.6%
Black or African American	1,641	2.3%
American Indian and Alaska Native	613	0.9%
Asian	8,018	11.3%
Native Hawaiian and Other Pacific Islander	180	0.3%
Some other race	7,056	10.0%
Two or more races	11,057	15.6%

=== 2023 ACS estimates ===
In 2023, the US Census Bureau estimated that the median household income was $109,390, and the per capita income was $56,144. About 5.8% of families and 7.5% of the population were below the poverty line.

=== 2010 census ===
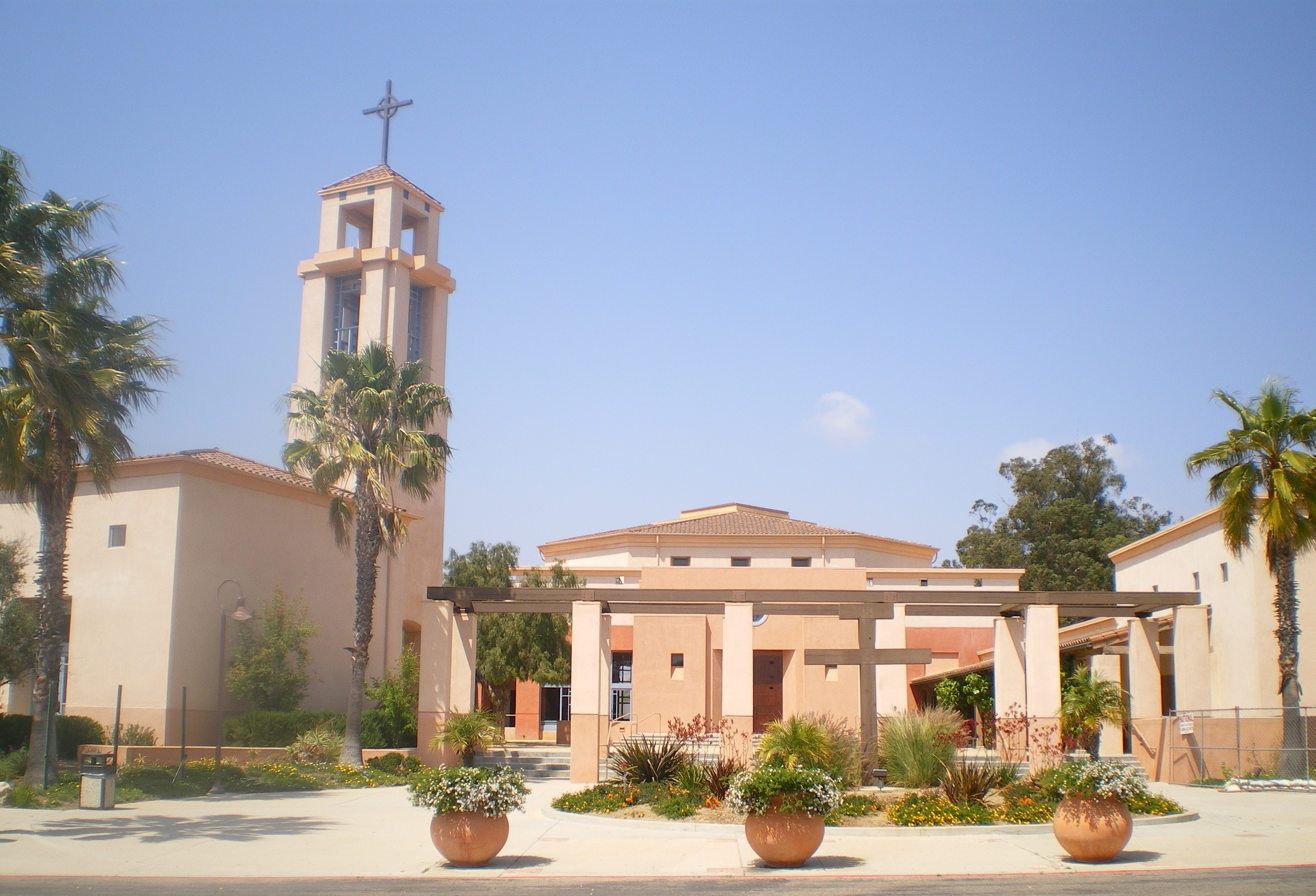
Saint Junípero Serra Church

The 2010 United States census reported that Camarillo had a population of 65,201. The population density was 3,336.3 people per square mile (1,288.2 people/km^{2}). The racial makeup of Camarillo was 48,947 (75.1%) White, 1,216 (1.9%) African American, 397 (0.6%) Native American, 6,633 (10.2%) Asian, 116 (0.2%) Pacific Islander, 4,774 (7.3%) from other races, and 3,118 (4.8%) from two or more races. Hispanic or Latino of any race were 14,958 persons (22.9%).

The Census reported that 64,705 people (99.2% of the population) lived in households, 155 (0.2%) lived in non-institutionalized group quarters, and 341 (0.5%) were institutionalized.

There were 24,504 households, out of which 8,103 (33.1%) had children under the age of 18 living in them, 13,565 (55.4%) were traditional married couples living together, 2,386 (9.7%) had a female householder with no husband present, 1,078 (4.4%) had a male householder with no wife present. There were 1,257 (5.1%) non-traditional couples or partnerships. 5,986 households (24.4%) were made up of individuals, and 3,231 (13.2%) had someone living alone who was 65 years of age or older. The average household size was 2.64. There were 17,029 families (69.5% of all households); the average family size was 3.14.

The population was spread out, with 15,115 people (23.2%) under the age of 18, 5,164 people (7.9%) aged 18 to 24, 15,895 people (24.4%) aged 25 to 44, 17,825 people (27.3%) aged 45 to 64, and 11,202 people (17.2%) who were 65 years of age or older. The median age was 40.8 years. For every 100 females, there were 93.7 males. For every 100 females age 18 and over, there were 90.7 males.

There were 25,702 housing units at an average density of 1,315.1 units per square mile (507.8 units/km^{2}), of which 17,059 (69.6%) were owner-occupied, and 7,445 (30.4%) were occupied by renters. The homeowner vacancy rate was 1.4%; the rental vacancy rate was 5.2%. 45,522 people (69.8% of the population) lived in owner-occupied housing units and 19,183 people (29.4%) lived in rental housing units.

== Economy ==
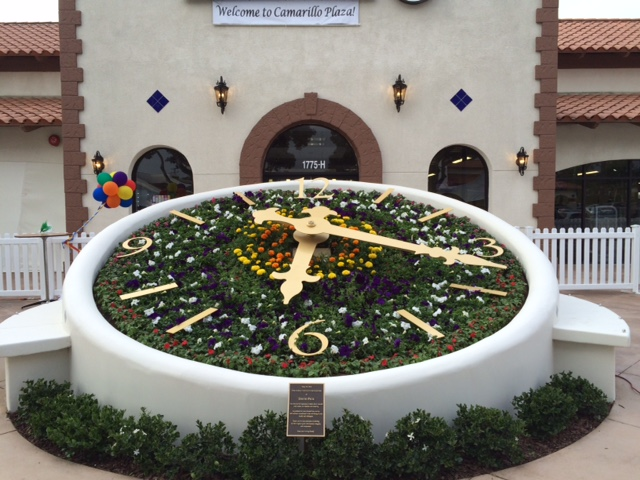
The clock in Camarillo Plaza

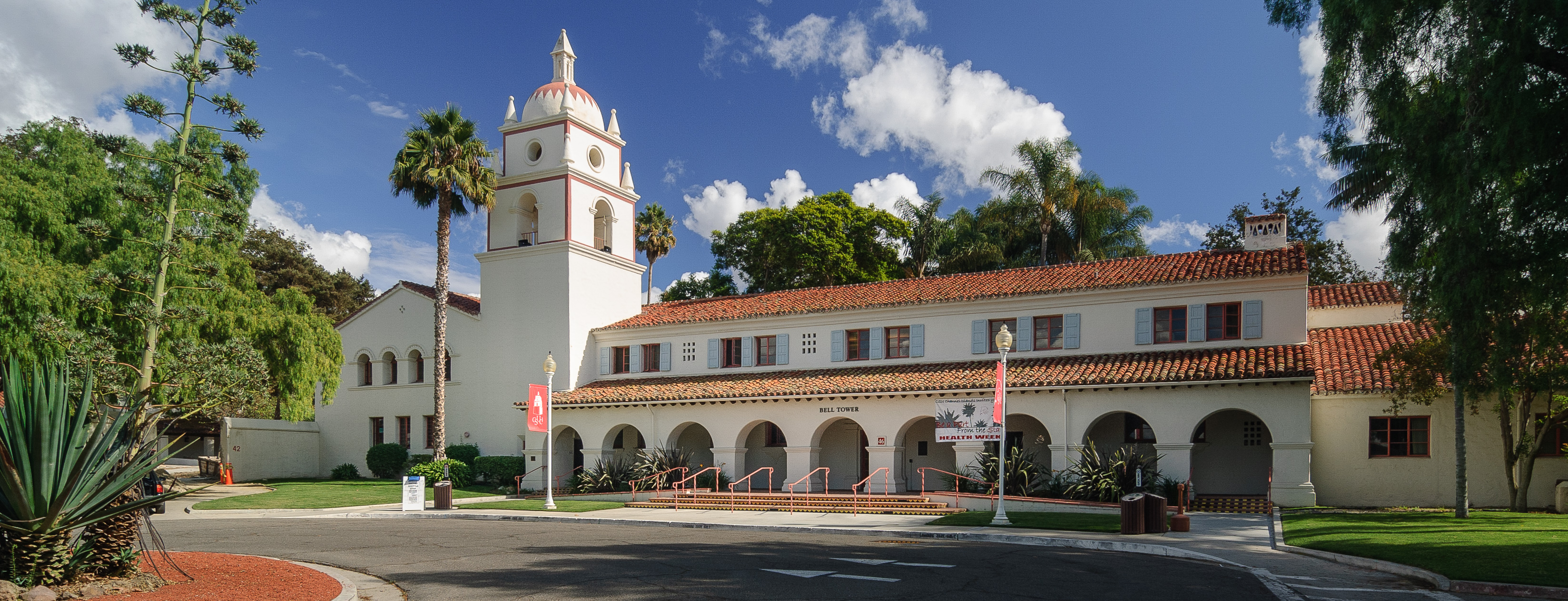
The former Camarillo State Hospital serves as the campus of California State University Channel Islands.

Semtech, Salem Communications, and Surfware are based in Camarillo.

=== Top civilian employers ===
According to the city's 2020 Comprehensive Annual Financial Report, the ten largest employers are:

#	Employer	# of Employees
1	Pleasant Valley School District	729
2	St. John's Hospital Camarillo	611
3	Meissner Filtration Products	510
4	Hi-Temp Insulation	463
5	Alert Communications	421
6	Teledyne Scientific & Imaging	289
7	Lucix Corp	250
8	Hygiena LLC	204
9	Mike's Farm Labor Contractor	200
10	Identity Management Services Org LLC	189

== Education ==
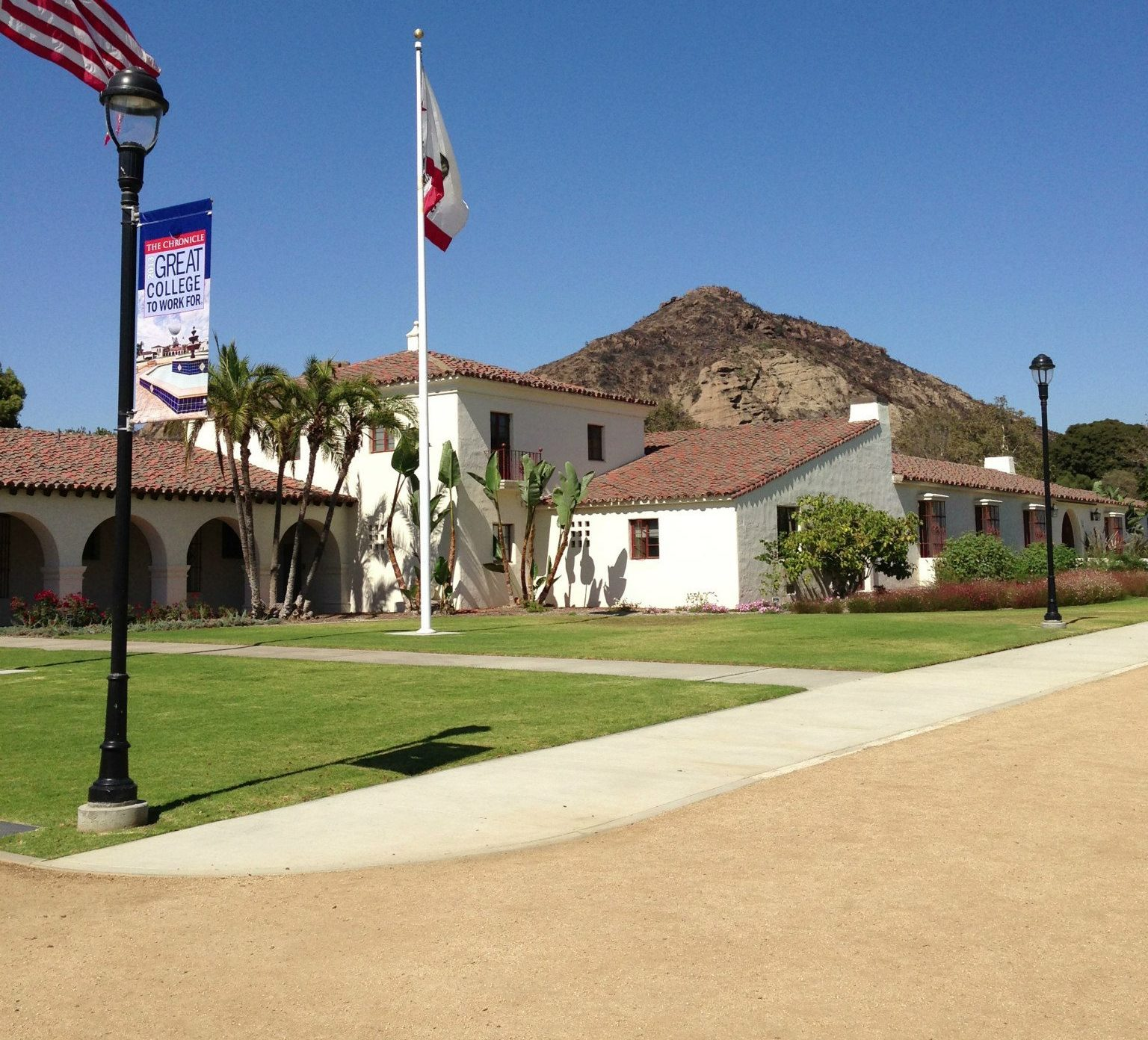
Campus of California State University Channel Islands

The primary public high schools serving Camarillo are Adolfo Camarillo High School in Mission Oaks, Rio Mesa High School in Strickland between Oxnard and Camarillo, and Rancho Campana High School near the intersection of Lewis Road and Las Posas Road. All three high schools are part of the Oxnard Union High School District.

=== California State University Channel Islands ===
Camarillo State Mental Hospital was established near the city in the 1930s so that persons suffering from mental illnesses or tuberculosis could recover in Ventura County's balmy climate. Jazzman Charlie Parker's "Relaxin' at Camarillo", written while he was detoxing from heroin addiction, is a tribute to the facility. The song "Camarillo" by punk outfit Fear is also written about the facility. The band Ambrosia released a song called "Ready for Camarillo" on their 1978 Life Beyond L.A. album. "Ready for Camarillo" also appeared as the single B side of their hit "How Much I Feel". The former hospital is the now the site of California State University Channel Islands. The university has retained the distinctive Mission Revival-style bell tower in the South quad.

The Camarillo State Hospital was closed in the 1990s and remained vacant until the site was converted into California State University Channel Islands (CSUCI). CSUCI officially opened in August 2002 and is accredited by the WASC.

== Parks and recreation ==
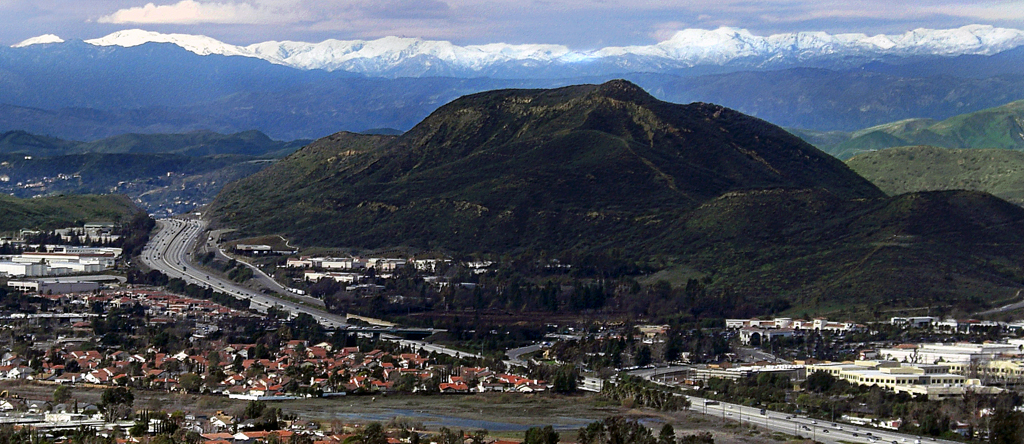
The Conejo Grade, also known as the Camarillo Grade

The Pleasant Valley Recreation and Park District operates recreational facilities in Camarillo.

=== Parks ===
- Adolfo Park
- Arneill Ranch Park
- Birchview Park
- Bob Kildee Community Park
- Calleguas Creek
- Camarillo Grove Park
- Carmenita Park
- Charter Oak Park
- Community Center Park
- Dos Caminos Park
- Encanto Park
- Foothill Park
- Freedom Park
- Heritage Park
- Laurelwood Park
- Eldred Lokker Memorial Park
- Mission Oaks Park
- Nancy Bush Park
- Pitts Ranch Park
- Pleasant Valley Fields
- Quito Park
- Springville Park
- Trailside Park
- Valle Lindo Park
- Woodcreek Park
- Woodside Park

==== Facilities ====
- Aquatic Center
- Auditorium
- Classrooms
- Community Center
- Dirt BMX Track
- Equestrian Center
- Freedom Center
- Freedom Gym
- Roller Hockey Rink
- R/C Track
- Senior Center
- Skatepark

=== Camarillo Christmas Parade ===
The Pleasant Valley Recreation and Park District has hosted the Camarillo Christmas Parade since 1962. The Christmas Parade usually occurs during the first or second weekend in December. Hundreds of organizations and thousands of people participate in the parade. Community Members come from all over to watch the parade. Notable Grand Marshals have included Jessica Mendoza, Lisa Guerrero, Jack Wilson, Fernando Vargas, and Walter Brennan.

== Government ==
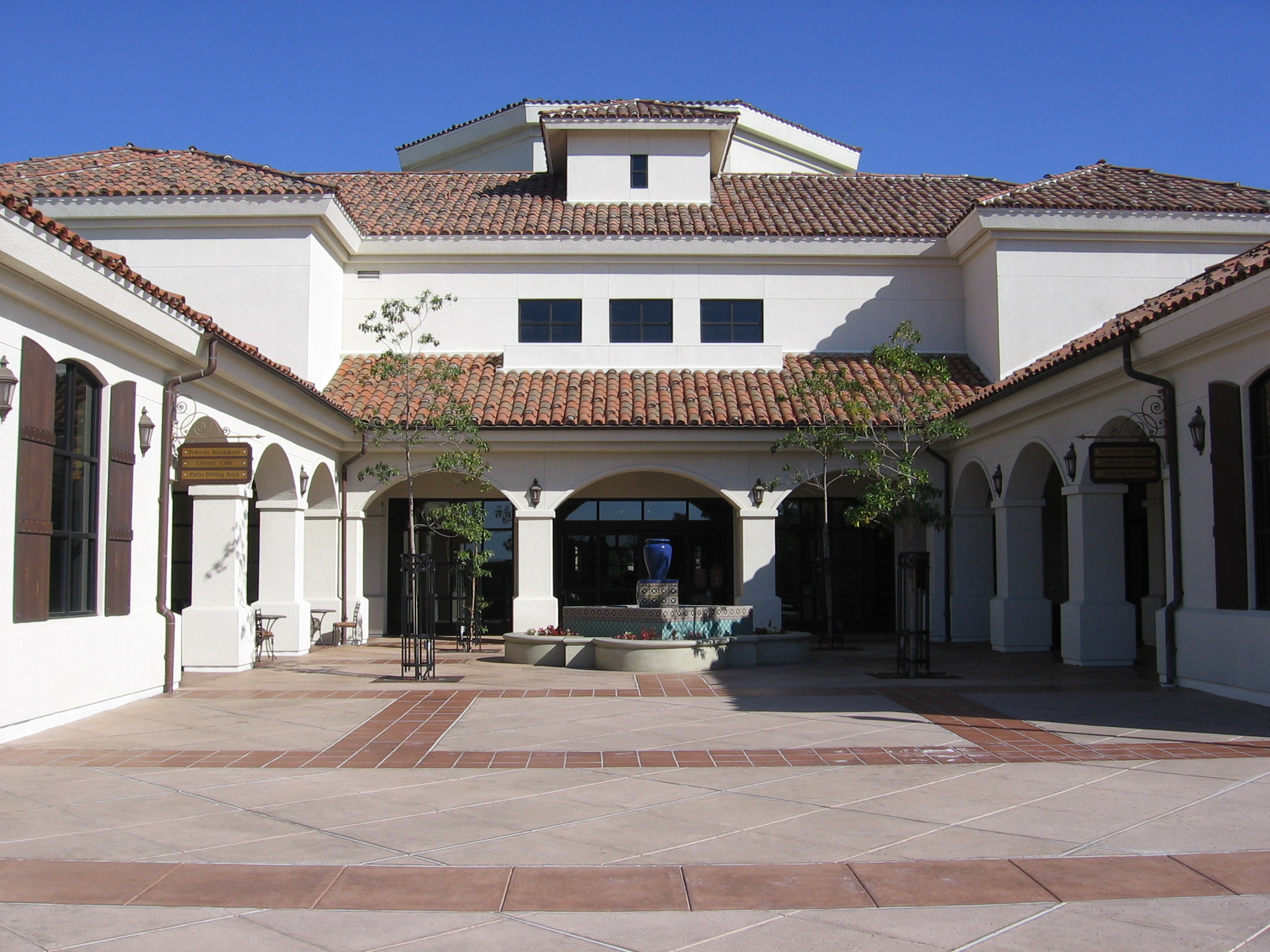
Camarillo Public Library

At the city's incorporation in 1964, a council-manager form of government was created. The five member city council is elected at large for four-year terms. The council is responsible for establishing policy, enacting laws and making legal and financial decisions for the city. A city manager, hired by the council and answerable to it, is responsible for the day-to-day operation of the city. That person is charged with overall management of the five city departments. Services such as water, sewer, trash collection, street maintenance and traffic engineering are provided by a combination of contractors and city employees.

Police services are provided by the Ventura County Sheriff's Department under contract to the city, headquartered in a police station owned by the city. The contract providing police services has been in place since the incorporation of Camarillo in 1964. The Sheriff's department helicopter fleet is hangared at Camarillo Airport. Ventura County Fire Department provides fire protection, with five stations within the city limits.

In 2000, Camarillo was a stronghold for the Republican Party, and had nearly twice as many Republican voters as Democratic voters. By 2020, voter registration for both parties was close to even.

Library

On October 13, 2010, the Camarillo City Council voted 5–0 to withdraw from the Ventura County Library System, and enter into a public-private contract with Library Systems & Services (LSSI) of Germantown, Maryland, a private company that administers several libraries throughout the United States, to provide locally hired staffing and to manage the day-to-day operations of the City of Camarillo Public Library. Under the partnership agreement, the library will remain in the public trust, managed by the City of Camarillo and operated by LSSI.

On January 1, 2011, the City of Camarillo Public Library opened as a municipal public library.

== Infrastructure ==
=== Transportation ===
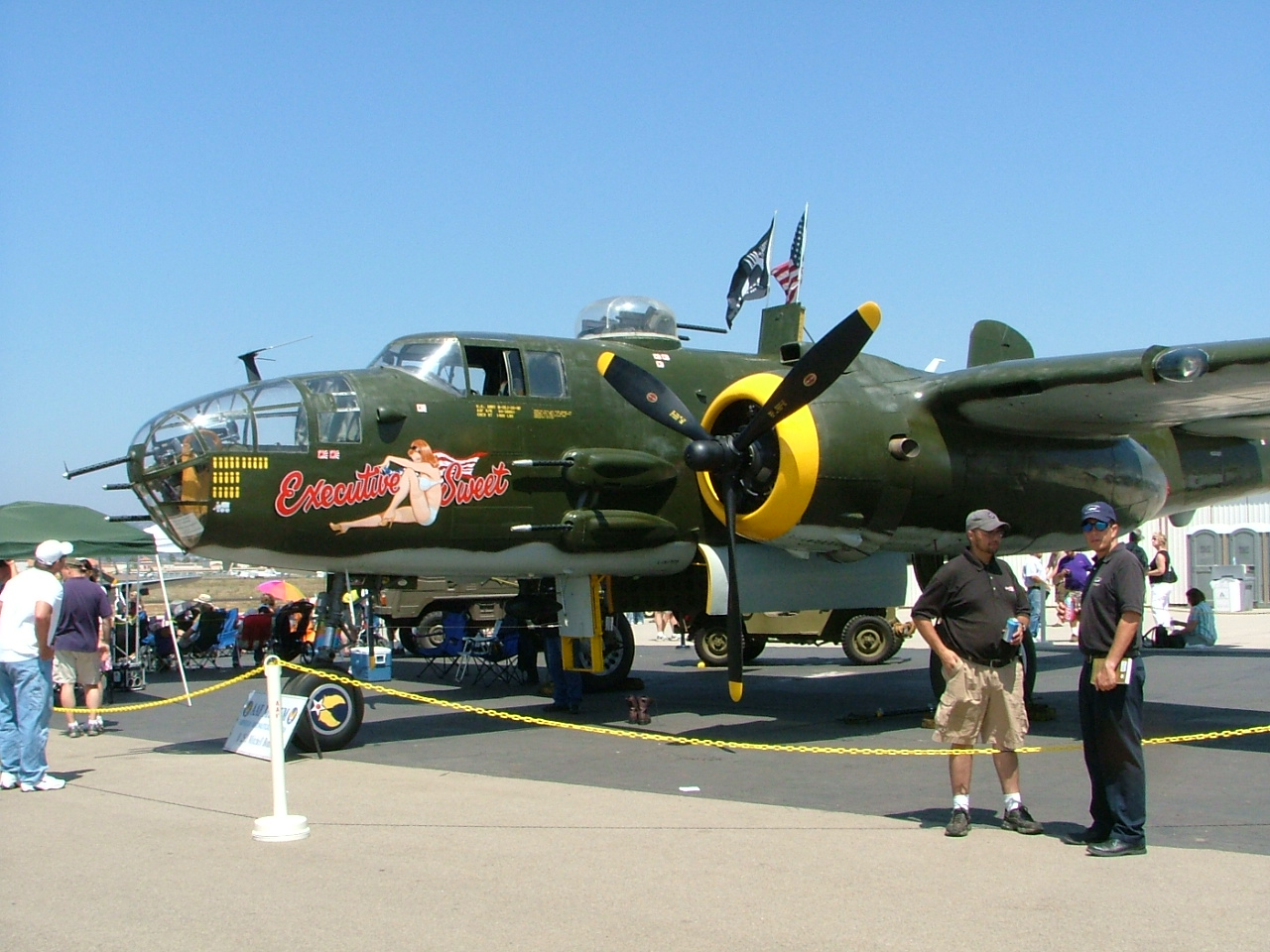
Wings Over Camarillo airshow at Camarillo Airport, 2008

VCTC Intercity operates buses between Camarillo and several nearby cities, including the Conejo Express to the Warner Center area of Los Angeles.

The City of Camarillo operates a trolley within central Camarillo, which runs from 10:00 to 6:00 Sunday through Thursday and later into the evening on Friday and Saturday nights. CAT operates one scheduled bus line Monday through Friday within Camarillo, and Dial-A-Ride services for the disabled Monday through Saturday.

Camarillo Airport (ICAO: KCMA, FAA LID: CMA) is a public airport located 3 miles (4.8 km) west of the central business district of Camarillo. The airport has one runway and serves privately operated general aviation and executive aircraft, with no scheduled commercial service.

Camarillo station is served by both Amtrak's Pacific Surfliner from San Luis Obispo to San Diego and Metrolink's Ventura County Line from Los Angeles Union Station to Montalvo. Ten Pacific Surfliner trains serve the station daily and six Metrolink trains serve the station each weekday and four each weekend day, with the majority of this limited Metrolink service at peak hours in the peak direction of travel (i.e., two morning departures to Los Angeles and two evening arrivals from Los Angeles).

=== Water ===
The city of Camarillo water system serves about two-thirds of its residents. It imports about 60 percent of its water from the state water project through the Calleguas Municipal Water District and 40 percent is pumped from three wells. The North Pleasant Valley Desalter Project began construction in 2008. The brackish well water from the Calleguas Creek watershed will be treated by the $66.3 million project. The project began construction in September 2019. The city held a ribbon cutting ceremony in November 2021 as the plant began to operate. After extensive testing and adjustments, the plant started producing water for the city in January 2023.

The Camrosa Water District serves nearly 30,000 people in Camarillo and the Santa Rosa Valley along with agricultural customers. The district, which covers 31 square miles (80 km^{2}) is headquartered in Camarillo. Camrosa completed the Round Mountain Water Treatment Plant, a desalting facility, in 2015. It cleans up brackish groundwater and produces 1,000 acre-feet (1,200,000 m^{3}) of drinking water a year. The facility was the first paying customer for the Calleguas Regional Salinity Management Project.

=== Wastewater ===
A city facility processes and treats 75% of the wastewater. Camrosa Water District processes the rest.

== Notable people ==
- August Ames, adult film actress
- Bryan Anger, NFL punter
- Bill Austin, football player of the 1950s
- Bob and Mike Bryan, brothers and professional tennis players, 16 major championships, Olympic gold medalists
- Zach Charbonnet, football player for Seattle Seahawks.
- Brandon Cruz, actor and musician
- Kaley Cuoco, actress, star of The Big Bang Theory
- Jeremy Fischer, high jumper and coach
- Scott Fujita, linebacker for Cleveland Browns
- Nat Gertler, writer, comics creator (About Comics)
- Jaime Jaquez Jr., basketball player for the Miami Heat 2023–present
- Ashley Johnson, actress
- Bobby Kimball, wide receiver for Green Bay Packers 1979–80
- Charlie Kimball, Indycar driver
- Henry Koster, Academy Award-nominated film director
- John D. Lowry, film restoration specialist
- Jessica Mendoza, USA softball player and ESPN baseball broadcaster
- Mad Mike, musician
- Peggy Moran, actress in films from 1938 to 1943
- Cyrus Nowrasteh, screenwriter, producer and director
- Mike Parrott, MLB pitcher for Baltimore Orioles and Seattle Mariners 1977–81
- Duncan Renaldo, Western actor best remembered for playing The Cisco Kid.
- JoJo Romero, Major League Baseball pitcher for the St. Louis Cardinals
- Marla Runyan, Paralympic gold medalist, one of only five athletes to participate in both Paralympics and Olympics
- Robert A. Rushworth, USAF astronaut
- Jimmie Sherfy, Major League Baseball pitcher
- Emil Sitka, actor of many films and television shows, most notably The Three Stooges film shorts
- Jeff Tackett, Major League Baseball catcher 1991–94
- Jason Wade, guitarist and vocalist of rock band Lifehouse
- Trevor Wallace, comedian, actor, podcaster
- Patrick Warburton, actor, known for TV series Seinfeld
- Delmon Young, Major League Baseball outfielder 2006–15

== See also ==
- Western Foundation of Vertebrate Zoology
