= Channel League =

High school athletic conference in California, US

The Channel League is a high school athletic conference in California affiliated with the CIF Southern Section.

== Schools ==
- Buena High School
- Dos Pueblos High School
- Oxnard High School
- Pacifica High School
- Rio Mesa High School
- San Marcos High School
- Santa Barbara High School
- Ventura High School

=== Former members ===
- Cabrillo High School (through 2022; joined Central Coast Athletic Association)
- Hueneme High School (through 1998; joined Pacific View League)
- Lompoc High School (through 2022; joined Central Coast Athletic Association)
- Santa Ynez Valley Union High School (through 2022; joined Central Coast Athletic Association)
- St. Bonaventure High School (2002–2009, football only; joined Marmonte League in 2010)

=== Football association ===
In April 2019, during the biennial releaguing process in the Northern Area of the CIF Southern Section, administrators from member schools approved a proposal to create an association with the Pacific View League in the sport of football only. The association, composed of the 12 schools from the two leagues combined, assigns each school to one of the leagues, with promotion and relegation taking place every two years. The plan was originally scheduled to begin in the 2020–21 school year. However, the COVID-19 pandemic has delayed its implementation, as the 2020 football season was postponed and shortened; upon the return of sports in early 2021, health officials in Ventura County prohibited schools there from playing teams in adjacent counties (this restriction was later lifted). In May 2021, another round of realignment saw the merging of the Channel League with the Pacific View League, beginning with the 2022–23 academic year. For the 2024–25 academic year, the Northern Area reorganized its constituent leagues again, creating a five-league tiered system of promotion and relegation for football, whereby the league membership of each tier will be reviewed every two years.

Marmonte League (1st tier)

- Bishop Diego High School
- Camarillo High School
- Oaks Christian School
- Pacifica High School
- Simi Valley High School
- St. Bonaventure High School

Conejo Coast League (2nd)

- Calabasas High School
- Newbury Park High School
- Rio Mesa High School
- Santa Barbara High School
- Thousand Oaks High School
- Westlake High School

Channel League (3rd)

- Buena High School
- Moorpark High School
- Oak Park High School
- Oxnard High School
- Royal High School
- Ventura High School

Tri-County League (4th)

- Agoura High School
- Dos Pueblos High School
- Fillmore High School
- Hueneme High School
- San Marcos High School
- Santa Paula High School

Citrus Coast League (5th)

- Carpinteria High School
- Channel Islands High School
- Del Sol High School
- Grace Brethren High School
- Nordhoff High School

== Sports ==
The Channel League sponsors the following sports:

=== Fall season ===
- Football (11-man)
- Cross country
- Boys' water polo
- Girls' golf
- Girls' tennis
- Girls' volleyball

=== Winter season ===
- Basketball
- Soccer
- Wrestling
- Girls' water polo

=== Spring season ===
- Baseball
- Boys' golf
- Lacrosse, Boys & Girls
- Softball
- Swimming
- Track and field
- Boys' tennis
- Boys' volleyball
