= Marmonte League =

High school athletic league in California

The Marmonte League is a high school athletic conference in California affiliated with the CIF Southern Section (CIF-SS). The league is composed of schools located in Ventura and Los Angeles counties.

== Member schools ==
=== Current ===
As of the 2020–21 school year, the league consists of the following schools in most sports:

- Agoura High School (1990–2018, 2020–present)
- Calabasas High School (1998–present)
- Newbury Park High School (1970–present)
- Oaks Christian School (2010–present in football, 2014–present in all other sports)
- Thousand Oaks High School
- Westlake High School

=== Former ===
- Camarillo High School (through 1998; joined Pacific View League)
- Channel Islands High School (through 1998; joined Pacific View League)
- Moorpark High School (1998–2014; joined Coastal Canyon League)
- Royal High School (1970–2014; joined Coastal Canyon League)
- Simi Valley High School (1970–2014; joined Coastal Canyon League)

=== Football association ===
In football, the Marmonte Football Association is composed of 13 schools, including those from the Marmonte and Coastal Canyon leagues as well as Bishop Diego and St. Bonaventure high schools. Established in 2014 with 14 members (the current 13 members plus Grace Brethren High School), the association assigned each school to one of three leagues in a system of promotion and relegation over a two-year period. (Oaks Christian and St. Bonaventure joined the Marmonte League for football only in 2010, predating the association's founding.) The previous league alignment, approved during the April 2019 releaguing process in the CIF-SS Northern Area, took effect with the 2020–21 school year, with leagues listed in order of strength from greatest to least. However, in early 2021, Grace Brethren suspended its football program and left the association; St. Bonaventure took its place in the top-tier Marmonte League. In May 2021, another round of realignment saw the elimination of the Camino League, beginning with the 2022–23 academic year. For the 2024–25 academic year, the Northern Area reorganized its constituent leagues again, creating a five-league tiered system of promotion and relegation for football, whereby the league membership of each tier will be reviewed every two years.

Marmonte League (1st tier)

- Bishop Diego High School
- Camarillo High School
- Oaks Christian School
- Pacifica High School
- Simi Valley High School
- St. Bonaventure High School

Conejo Coast League (2nd)

- Calabasas High School
- Newbury Park High School
- Rio Mesa High School
- Santa Barbara High School
- Thousand Oaks High School
- Westlake High School

Channel League (3rd)

- Buena High School
- Moorpark High School
- Oak Park High School
- Oxnard High School
- Royal High School
- Ventura High School

Tri-County League (4th)

- Agoura High School
- Dos Pueblos High School
- Fillmore High School
- Hueneme High School
- San Marcos High School
- Santa Paula High School

Citrus Coast League (5th)

- Carpinteria High School
- Channel Islands High School
- Del Sol High School
- Grace Brethren High School
- Nordhoff High School

== Sports ==
The Marmonte League sponsors the following sports:

=== Fall season ===
- Football
- Cross country
- Boys' water polo
- Girls' golf
- Girls' tennis
- Girls' volleyball
- Girls' Flag Football

=== Winter season ===
- Basketball
- Soccer
- Wrestling
- Girls' water polo

=== Spring season ===
- Baseball
- Boys' golf
- Lacrosse
- Softball
- Swimming/Diving
- Track and field
- Boys' tennis
- Boys' volleyball
- STUNT (competitive cheer)

== History ==
=== Early years ===
The Marmonte League was established in 1970. Originally, the league consisted of six schools in Los Angeles and Ventura counties: Canyon, Hart, Newbury Park, Oxnard, Royal, and Simi Valley high schools.

=== Westlake frosh/soph girls' basketball perfect season ===
In the 2009–2010 girls' basketball season, the Westlake frosh/soph team finished with a perfect record of 21–0 overall and a 14–0 in the Marmonte League. The team won its own Westlake Winter Invitational Tournament as well as the Camarillo Winter Classic. Coach Nick Kindel was selected as the 2010 F/S Marmonte League Girls Basketball Coach of the Year.

=== Denial of Derrick Brown transfer ===
In 2011, the CIF-SS and the Marmonte League denied Derrick "Deejay" Brown a hardship transfer request that would have allowed him to play basketball at Thousand Oaks High School. TOHS coach Richard Endres had become Brown's guardian. The student-athlete from Brooklyn, New York was a victim of domestic violence in 2009, when his stepfather attempted to kill both him and his mother. At the hearing to determine Brown's eligibility, principals of Marmonte League schools barred Endres from speaking or arguing on behalf of Brown. "They don't like it that he's living with me", said Endres, regarding Marmonte principals.

=== Westlake boys' basketball forced forfeit ===
On January 5, 2012, the CIF-SS required Westlake's varsity boys' basketball team to forfeit a win over Agoura. The Marmonte League victory was ruled invalid due to the fact that Westlake's junior varsity coach, John Elliot, sat on the varsity bench after having been ejected in the preceding junior varsity game. The ruling came despite the fact that the game official approved Elliot's presence at the varsity contest.

=== 2014 releaguing and Coastal Canyon League spinoff ===
Plans to revamp the entire Northern Area of the CIF Southern Section, which includes the Marmonte League, were in place for 2014. Those plans were quashed when Oaks Christian and St. Bonaventure high schools challenged the plan that would have them move out of Ventura County-based leagues into a league consisting of parochial schools in Los Angeles County. In March 2013, the two schools each won their appeal, allowing them to remain in local leagues. In April 2014, a new plan was approved that added Camarillo and Oak Park highs to the league, then split the Marmonte League into two circuits, one of which would retain the Marmonte name. The newly created league later was named the Coastal Canyon League. St. Bonaventure remained in the Tri-County Athletic Association for all sports except football.

== Coach of the Year ==
2007–2008

Boys Basketball Coach of the Year

Varsity - Christian Aurand (Simi Valley)

Girls Basketball Coach of the Year

Varsity - Nori Parvin (Newbury Park) Junior Varsity - Chuck Aplin (Thousand Oaks) Frosh/Soph - Neil Foreman (Thousand Oaks)

2008–2009

Boys Basketball Coach of the Year

Varsity - Richard Endres (Thousand Oaks)

Girls Basketball Coach of the Year

Varsity - Nori Parvin (Newbury Park) Junior Varsity - Chuck Aplin (Thousand Oaks) Frosh/Soph - Kerrie Marshall (Westlake)

2009–2010

Boys Basketball Coach of the Year

Varsity - Richard Endres (Thousand Oaks), Jon Palarz (Calabasas)

Girls Basketball Coach of the Year

Varsity - Steve Scifres (Agoura) Junior Varsity - Chuck Aplin (Thousand Oaks) Frosh/Soph - Nick Kindel (Westlake)

2010–2011

Boys Basketball Coach of the Year

Varsity - Craig Griffin (Royal), Christian Aurand (Simi Valley)

Girls Basketball Coach of the Year

Varsity - Darren Burge (Newbury Park) Junior Varsity - Chuck Aplin (Thousand Oaks) Frosh/Soph - Kyra Wendling (Agoura) and Ken Hill (Newbury Park)

2011–2012

Boys Basketball Coach of the Year

Varsity - Jon Palarz (Calabasas)

Girls Basketball Coach of the Year

Varsity - Gary Wallin (Thousand Oaks) Junior Varsity - Harry Carbonati (Moorpark) Frosh/Soph - Rob Douglas (Newbury Park)
