= Oxnard Union High School District =

School district in Ventura County, California

Address
- 1800 Solar Dr Oxnard, California, 93033; United States

District information
- Type: Public
- Grades: 9–12
- Established: 1901; 125 years ago
- Superintendent: Dr. Tom McCoy
- Schools: 11
- NCES District ID: 0629270

Students and staff
- Students: 17,327 (2020–2021)
- Teachers: 689.86 (FTE)
- Staff: 471.07 (FTE)
- Student–teacher ratio: 25.12:1

Other information
- Website: www.oxnardunion.org

The Oxnard Union High School District (OUHSD) is a union high school district in Ventura County, California. The district serves students in grades 9–12 on the Oxnard Plain, including the cities of Oxnard, Port Hueneme, and Camarillo, California as well as adjacent unincorporated communities including El Rio, Somis, and Channel Islands Beach. As of 2020 the superintendent is Dr. Tom McCoy.

== History ==
=== Formation and growth ===
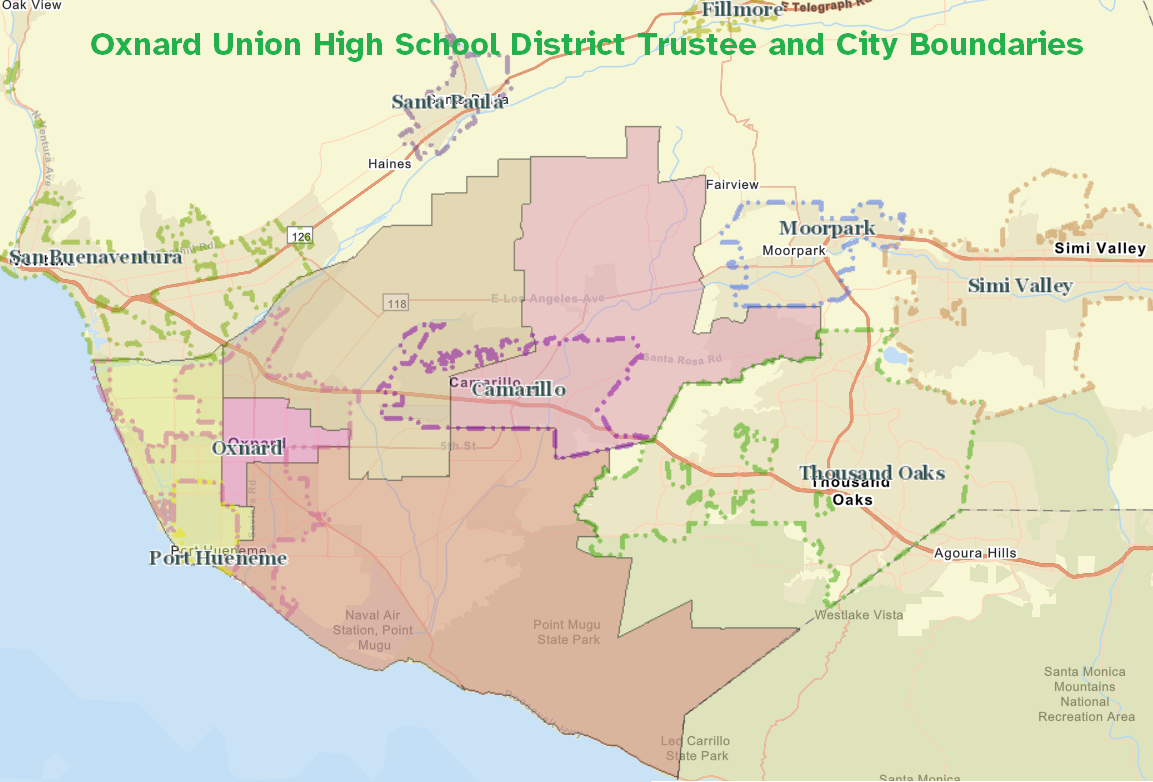
2024 Boundaries of Cities and Trustee Districts of Oxnard Union High School District

The Oxnard Union High School District was established in 1901. Oxnard High School, the first school formed under the auspices of the district, opened the following year near downtown Oxnard.

From 1957 to 1974, Joseph W. Crosby served as OUHSD superintendent. During his tenure, the district experienced massive population growth. His first major undertaking as Superintendent was to staff and open the newly constructed Adolfo Camarillo High School. Crosby then immediately spearheaded an ambitious construction program funded by a school bond measure that enabled the building of several new high schools: Hueneme (opened 1959), Thousand Oaks (1962), Rio Mesa (1965), Channel Islands (1966), and Newbury Park (1967).

On July 1, 1974, the Conejo Valley Unified School District (CVUSD) was formed in Thousand Oaks from the easternmost territory of OUHSD. The new district took control of the two existing public high schools within its boundaries, Thousand Oaks and Newbury Park.

In 1995, OUHSD relocated Oxnard High School to a new site on Gonzales Road, the first comprehensive campus to open in three decades. This replaced the original location on Fifth Street, which has stood in the flight path of Oxnard Airport since 1934. The city of Oxnard purchased the old campus and converted it into a park.

By 2023 the district budget was about $300 million per year. Statewide tests showed better achievement in language arts than in mathematics, even though the district served students speaking over nine languages, from Arabic to Zapotec.

=== 2004 bond for $135 million ===
Measure H, a $135 million bond measure, was passed by district voters in 2004 to build two new high schools and make improvements to existing campuses. The bond paid for two new swimming pools for Camarillo and Hueneme high schools that were finished in 2014. Delays and rising cost meant only one of the two new high schools was built from this bond, a new magnet high school in Camarillo, Rancho Campana, completed in 2015. At the time of Rancho Campana's opening, OUHSD was searching for sites in Oxnard for two more new campuses.

=== 2018 bond for $350 million ===
In the June 2018 primary election voters approved $350 million in bonds, Measure A, with 56.39% of the vote (55% needed to pass). It included more money for the second new school and a long list of other projects. On November 13, 2019, the district's board of trustees voted to purchase land for this school, a 53-acre (21 ha) parcel in northeast Oxnard for $26.9 million.

In 2018, Oxnard Union purchased a new headquarters building in northeast Oxnard jointly with the Rio School District. The offices on Solar Drive replace OUHSD's previous facilities on K Street which, like the old Oxnard High School, were also in the flight path of Oxnard Airport. The district sold the old headquarters and other surplus properties to help pay for the new headquarters.

Other projects were done at all schools, with costs generally higher than estimated.

=== 2021 COP financing for $49 million ===
In 2021 the District took out $49 million in extra financing to cover more of the cost of the new school. Certificates of Participation (COPs) are a commitment to make lease payments to a third party which borrows the money from investors without needing voter approval, under the California Constitution's exception for leases. Named Del Sol High School, the campus opened in August 2023.

=== 2024 bond for $285 million ===
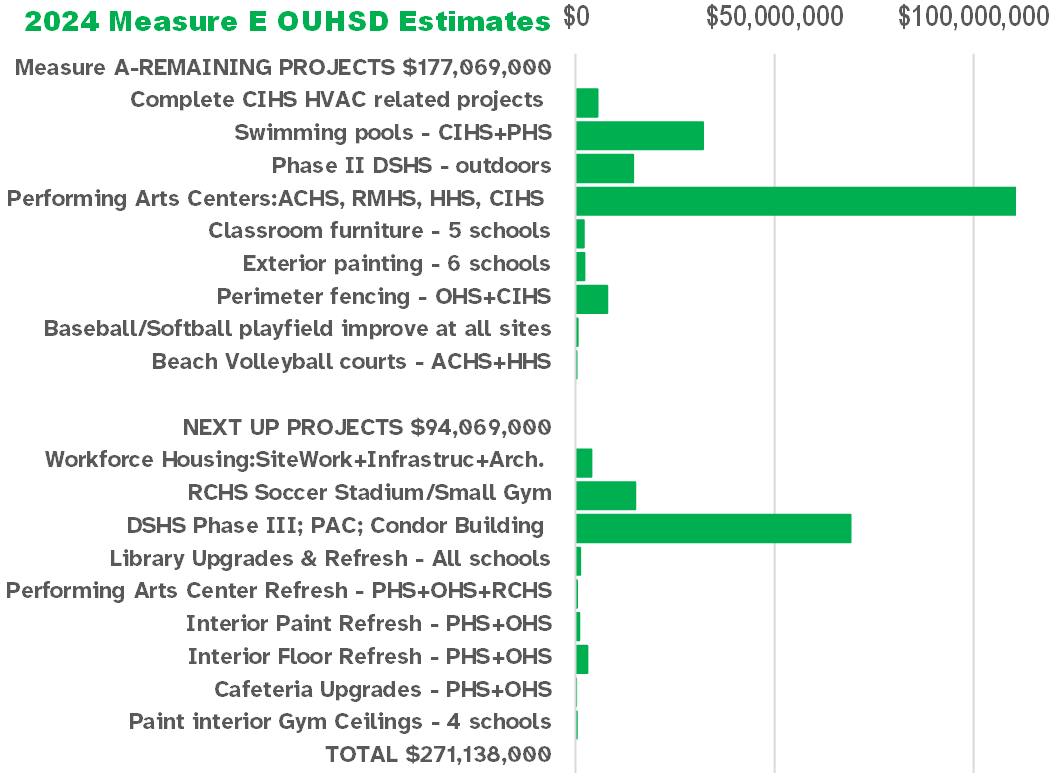
2024 Bond Issue Estimates for Oxnard Union High School District, California

The 2024 general election ballot included a $285 million bond issue, Measure E. The district estimated $177 million for projects which had not been done under Measure A, because of rising costs and lack of state matching funds. Most of this amount, $100 million, was for four high schools' performing arts centers, which had been estimated at $12 million total in 2018. Measure E also estimated $94 million for new projects, including extra work at the new Del Sol High School.

The bond passed with 56.8% of the vote. 55% was required to pass.

== Schools ==
=== Comprehensive schools ===
- Adolfo Camarillo High School
- Channel Islands High School
- Del Sol High School
- Hueneme High School
- Oxnard High School
- Pacifica High School
- Rio Mesa High School

=== Magnet schools ===
- Oxnard Middle College High School
- Rancho Campana High School

=== Alternative and continuation schools ===
- Condor High School Options Academy (comprises academy classrooms at Camarillo, Channel Islands, Hueneme, Oxnard, Pacifica, and Rio Mesa high schools)
- Frontier High School

=== Adult schools ===
- Oxnard Adult School

=== Charter schools ===
- Architecture, Construction & Engineering Charter High School (ACE Charter)
- Camarillo Academy of Progressive Education (CAPE, K—8)

=== Former schools ===
- Puente High School (2000–2009)
- Pacific View High School (1999–2007)

== Feeder districts ==
- Hueneme School District
- Mesa Union School District
- Ocean View Elementary School District
- Oxnard Elementary School District
- Pleasant Valley School District
- Rio School District
- Somis Union School District

== Sports ==
From 1998 to 2014, all of the comprehensive high schools in the Oxnard Union High School District played in the Pacific View League (PVL), which was formed to comprise the district schools. Prior to that establishment, Camarillo and Channel Islands participated in the Marmonte League, while Hueneme, Oxnard, and Rio Mesa were part of the Channel League. Pacifica High School joined the PVL when it opened its doors in 2001. In 2014, Camarillo left the league to join the new Coastal Canyon League, mostly comprising members of the Marmonte League. In 2018, Hueneme left the PVL to join the Citrus Coast League, a new circuit composed of several small public high schools.
