= Pacific View League =

The Pacific View League (PVL) was a high school athletic conference in California affiliated with the CIF Southern Section. The league was formed in 1998, pulling Camarillo and Channel Islands high schools from the Marmonte League to join Hueneme, Oxnard, and Rio Mesa highs from the Channel League. Pacifica High School joined the league when it opened its doors in 2001.

For most of its history, the PVL consisted entirely of schools from the Oxnard Union High School District, including the five charter members (Camarillo, Channel Islands, Hueneme, Oxnard, and Rio Mesa). As of the 2018–19 school year, all member schools are located in or near Oxnard and Ventura in Ventura County, California.

In May 2021, it was announced that the Pacific View League would merge with the Channel League beginning with the 2022–23 academic year, and take on the Channel League name.

== Member schools ==
- Buena High School (2018–2022)
- Oxnard High School (1998–2022)
- Pacifica High School (2001–2022)
- Rio Mesa High School (1998–2022)
- Ventura High School (2018–2022)

=== Former members ===
- Adolfo Camarillo High School (1998–2014; joined Coastal Canyon League)
- Cate School (girls' water polo only)
- Channel Islands High School (1998–2022; joined Citrus Coast League in all sports except football)
- Hueneme High School (1998–2018; joined Citrus Coast League)

=== Football association with Channel League ===
In April 2019, during the biennial releaguing process in the Northern Area of the CIF Southern Section, administrators from member schools approved a proposal to create an association with the Channel League in the sport of football only. The association, composed of the 12 schools from the two leagues combined, assigns each school to one of the leagues, with promotion and relegation taking place every two years. The plan was originally scheduled to begin for the 2020–21 academic year. However, the COVID-19 pandemic has delayed its implementation, as the 2020 football season was postponed and shortened; upon the return of sports in early 2021, health officials in Ventura County prohibited schools there from playing teams in adjacent counties (this restriction was later lifted).

== Sports ==
The Pacific View League sponsors the following sports:

=== Fall season ===
- Football (11-man)
- Cross country
- Girls' volleyball
- Girls' tennis
- Boys' water polo
- Girls' golf

=== Winter season ===
- Basketball
- Soccer
- Girls' water polo
- Wrestling

=== Spring season ===
- Baseball
- Boys' golf
- Softball
- Swimming and diving
- Boys' tennis
- Track and field (Note: The Pacific View League does not sponsor the pole vault event.)
- Boys' volleyball
