= Tri-County Athletic Association =

High school athletic league in California

The Tri-County Athletic Association (TCAA) is a high school athletic conference in California affiliated with the CIF Southern Section. Established in 2006, the association is an amalgamation of the Tri-Valley League and the Frontier League. The TCAA uses a system of promotion and relegation to place each school's teams, by sport and gender, into either league for a two-year period based on performance. As of the 2018–19 school year, the association is composed primarily of private schools located in Santa Barbara and Ventura counties.

In 2018, five public-school members of the TCAA left to form the Citrus Coast League. Santa Clara High School, a private Catholic school, also joined that league for football only.

== Member schools ==
- Bishop Diego High School (2006–present; joined Marmonte League in 2014 for football)
- Cate School (2014–present)
- Foothill Technology High School (2014–present)
- Grace Brethren High School (2006–present; joined Marmonte League in 2014 for football)
- La Reina High School (2006–present)
- Providence School (2018–present)
- Santa Clara High School (2006–present; joined Citrus Coast League in 2018 for football)
- St. Bonaventure High School (2006–present; joined Marmonte League in 2010 for football)
- Thacher School (2014–present)
- Villanova Preparatory School (2006–present)
- Laguna Blanca School (2017–present)
- Dunn School, Los Olivos (2019–present)

=== Former members ===
- Carpinteria High School (2006–2018; joined Citrus Coast League)
- Fillmore High School (2006–2018; joined Citrus Coast League)
- Malibu High School (2006–2018; joined Citrus Coast League)
- Nordhoff High School (2006–2018; joined Citrus Coast League)
- Oak Park High School (2006–2014; joined Coastal Canyon League)
- Oaks Christian School (2006–2014; joined Marmonte League in 2010 for football and 2014 for all other sports)
- Santa Paula High School (2006–2018; joined Citrus Coast League)

== Sports ==
The Tri-County Athletic Association sponsors the following sports:

=== Fall season ===
- Cross country
- Girls' volleyball
- Girls' tennis
- Girls' golf

=== Winter season ===
- Basketball
- Soccer
- Girls' water polo
- Wrestling

=== Spring season ===
- Baseball
- Boys' golf
- Softball
- Swimming and diving
- Boys' tennis
- Track and field (Note: The Tri-County Athletic Association does not sponsor the pole vault event.)
- Boys' volleyball
