= Darrell Scott (American football) =

American football player (born 1989)

Profile
- Position: Running back

Personal information
- Born: April 16, 1989 (age 37); Tallahassee, Florida, U.S.
- Listed height: 6 ft 1 in (1.85 m)
- Listed weight: 236 lb (107 kg)

Career information
- High school: St. Bonaventure (Ventura, California)
- College: Colorado; South Florida
- NFL draft: 2012: undrafted

Career history
- Dallas Cowboys (2012)*
- * Offseason or practice squad member only

Awards and highlights
- Second-team All-Big East (2011)

Darrell Scott (born April 16, 1989) is an American former professional football running back. He attended the University of South Florida, where he redshirted the 2010 college football season after having transferred from the University of Colorado. Scott attended St. Bonaventure High School in Ventura, California. Scott was considered the #1 running back of the 2008 high school class by Rivals.com and has drawn comparisons to LaDainian Tomlinson.

== Early life ==
Scott was born in Tallahassee, Florida and spent parts of his childhood in Texas, before his family eventually moved to California. He enrolled at public Moorpark High School, where he had an outstanding football career, helping his team to reach the section championship game consecutive years in 2005 and 2006. In his junior year, Scott rushed for 3,194 yards on 337 carries. He also scored 45 touchdowns.

In order to face tougher competition in his senior year, Scott sought to transfer to a private school. His mother and stepfather reportedly “shopped their kid around”, inquiring several Los Angeles area high schools with elite football programs—among them Hart and Oaks Christian—about an enrollment, which caused some friction among Ventura County coaches. Scott eventually ended up at St. Bonaventure High School, where he rushed for 2,433 yards and 34 touchdowns. He helped St. Bonaventure complete a 14–1 season by winning the CIF Southern Section Northern Division title and capturing the Division III state championship. Following his high school career, Scott played in the 2008 U.S. Army All-American Bowl.

Scott received scholarship offers by more than 40 schools, and eventually narrowed his choices to Colorado, Texas, Florida, and Louisiana State. Colorado was widely believed to be the frontrunner, since his uncle, Josh Smith, was playing wide receiver for the Colorado Buffaloes before deciding to leave the program. However, with Jamaal Charles leaving for the 2008 NFL draft, Scott instantly increased his interest in the Texas Longhorns. Scott then gave Texas a private commitment, which changed after Texas running backs coach, Ken Rucker, became the team’s director of high school relations and player development. Scott announced his decision to attend Colorado during a news conference at the ESPN Zone in Anaheim on National Signing Day. His decision was carried live on ESPNU. Scott was the highest rated football recruit to attend Colorado since Marcus Houston of Thomas Jefferson High School in Denver came to Boulder as part of the 2000 class.

== College career ==
Scott played at tailback for the 2008 Colorado Buffaloes as a true freshman. Phil Steele's College Football, based on his prep accomplishments, selected him to its preseason second-team All-Big 12 squad, while the Sporting News selected him as the Big 12’s top impact freshman and Lindy’s Big 12 Football tabbed him as the Offensive Newcomer of the Year in the conference.

In his first game for the Buffaloes, Scott rushed for 54 yards on 11 carries and scored his first career touchdown on a 1-yard jump with 2:14 left in the game. He finished his freshman season with 343 rushing yards off of 87 carries.

After drawing only one running play in Colorado's 2009 season opening loss to Colorado State, Scott told The Denver Post that he wanted more carries.

On November 3, 2009, Scott announced his intention to transfer to UCLA, because of his lack of playing time at Colorado. His uncle Josh Smith left Colorado for UCLA before the summer of 2009. Further, the Los Angeles Times cited unnamed sources within the Bruins’ program that UCLA was not interested in landing Scott, since they already had five tailbacks, and a commitment from former four-star recruit Malcolm Jones.

Scott paid an official visit to the University of Cincinnati on March 11–12, 2010. He was also believed to have spoken to Georgia Tech, Houston, Tulsa and Wyoming about potentially playing for their programs.

On June 22, 2010, he decided to transfer to the University of South Florida, where he had two years of eligibility remaining after sitting out the 2010 season as a transfer. In his only on-field season at South Florida, Scott appeared in 11 games and started in 8, carrying the ball 153 times for 815 yards and 6 touchdowns (a 5.3 yard-per-carry average), with another 15 catches for 169 yards and one additional touchdown. In the best game of his career, Scott rushed for 164 yards and three touchdowns against Florida A&M, where he also caught his sole receiving touchdown. Though Darrell battled injury that constantly kept him off of the field, his performance named him as a 2nd-team All-Big East running back.

== Professional career ==
Pre-draft measurables
Height	Weight	Arm length	Hand span	40-yard dash	20-yard shuttle	Three-cone drill	Vertical jump	Broad jump	Bench press
6 ft + 1/8 in (1.83 m)	231 lb (105 kg)	32 in (0.81 m)	8 1/4 in (0.21 m)	4.69 s	4.27 s	7.10 s	31 1/2 in (0.80 m)	9 ft 9 in (2.97 m)	18 reps
All values from NFL Combine, except for 20-ss, 3-cone, Broad, and BP, which are from South Florida Pro Day.

Scott decided to forgo his final year of eligibility and entered the 2012 NFL draft. He was projected to go undrafted by Sports Illustrated, which he ultimately did. He was signed immediately after the draft by the Dallas Cowboys. Scott was cut after the 2012 season without having played a down.
