= Citrus Coast League =

American high school athletic conference

The Citrus Coast League (CCL) is a high school athletic conference in California that is affiliated with the CIF Southern Section. Established in 2018, the league consists primarily of small public high schools in Ventura County, with one member each in Los Angeles and Santa Barbara counties. Most CCL schools competed previously as members of the Tri-County Athletic Association, with Hueneme High School joining from the Pacific View League.

In 2019, Malibu and Santa Clara high schools switched their 11-man football programs to an eight-man format, citing a lack of players. As a result, both schools no longer compete in the Citrus Coast League in that sport.

== Member schools ==
- Carpinteria High School (2018–present)
- Channel Islands High School (2022–present)
- Del Sol High School (2023–present; all sports except football)
- Fillmore High School (2018–present; all sports except football)
- Hueneme High School (2018–present; all sports except football)
- Malibu High School (2018–present; all sports except football)
- Nordhoff High School (2018–present)
- Santa Paula High School (2018–present; all sports except football)

=== Affiliate members ===
- Grace Brethren High School (football)

=== Former members ===
- Santa Clara High School (2018, football only; switched to 8-man football)

== Sports ==
The Citrus Coast League sponsors the following sports:

=== Fall season ===
- Football (11-man)
- Cross country
- Girls' volleyball
- Girls' tennis
- Boys' water polo
- Girls' golf

=== Winter season ===
- Basketball
- Soccer
- Girls' water polo
- Wrestling

=== Spring season ===
- Baseball
- Boys' golf
- Softball
- Swimming and diving
- Boys' tennis
- Track and field (Note: The Citrus Coast League does not sponsor the pole vault event.)
- Boys' volleyball
