= Ken Duncan (American football) =

American football player (born 1946)

No. 18
- Position: Punter

Personal information
- Born: February 28, 1946 (age 80); Rock Island, Illinois, U.S.
- Listed height: 6 ft 2 in (1.88 m)
- Listed weight: 210 lb (95 kg)

Career information
- High school: Carpinteria (Carpinteria, California)
- College: Ventura CC (1964–1965); Tulsa (1966–1970)
- NFL draft: 1971: 17th round, 439th overall pick

Career history
- Minnesota Vikings (1971)*; Green Bay Packers (1971); Cincinnati Bengals (1973)*
- * Offseason or practice squad member only

Career NFL statistics
- Punts: 6
- Punting yards: 216
- Average punt: 36
- Stats at Pro Football Reference

Kenneth W. Duncan (born February 28, 1946) is an American former professional football player who was a punter in the National Football League (NFL). He played college football for the Ventura Pirates and Tulsa Golden Hurricane and was selected in the 17th round of the 1971 NFL draft by the Minnesota Vikings. He played one season for the Green Bay Packers in 1972 and was also briefly a member of the Cincinnati Bengals in 1973.

== Early life ==
Duncan was born on February 28, 1946, in Rock Island, Illinois. He first attended San Marcos High School in California before transferring to Carpinteria High School, where he competed in football, basketball and track and field as a junior and senior. As a junior, he was named first-team all-league in basketball and set the league record in the shot put. He then averaged 17.7 points per game as a senior in basketball and was selected All-California Interscholastic Federation (CIF). He concluded as a two-time all-league selection in both football and basketball, and as a senior he also set the league high jump record. Duncan graduated from Carpinteria in 1964.

== College career ==
After high school, Duncan enrolled at Ventura College in 1964, playing for the school's football and basketball teams. A wide receiver in football, he was named All-Western States Conference (WSC) in 1964 and repeated in 1965 after setting a school record with 56 receptions. He helped the 1965 football team win the WSC title and served as team captain with the basketball team. Duncan transferred to the University of Tulsa in 1966 but did not have enough college credits and was thus ineligible to play for the Tulsa Golden Hurricane football team. He redshirted for the 1966 season. In 1967, Duncan was selected into the United States Army to serve in the Vietnam War. He was stationed at Nha Trang and served in the United States Army Signal Corps until returning to the U.S. in October 1968.

Duncan returned to the University of Tulsa in 1969 and became the football team's starting punter, while also playing split end. During the season, he caught 31 passes for 378 yards and three touchdowns while also being a top punter, recording an 87-yard punt that was both the longest nationally that year and a school record. In 1970, he caught nine passes for 152 yards and averaged 41 yards per punt to rank among the top punters nationally. He was named an All-American by The Sporting News for his performance and also served as Tulsa's co-team captain for the 1970 season. Duncan was the Missouri Valley Conference (MVC) punting leader in both his seasons playing with Tulsa. He also had four rush attempts on fake punts at Tulsa, with the Tulsa World noting that "you just never know what he's going to do when he drops back to punt a football".

== Professional career ==
Duncan was selected by the Minnesota Vikings in the 17th round (439th overall) of the 1971 NFL draft. However, he was later released without playing in a game, as the Vikings decided to have quarterback Bob Lee perform punting duties. After being released by the Vikings, he was claimed off waivers by the Green Bay Packers. Duncan made his NFL debut in the Packers' Week 2 game against the Denver Broncos, punting twice for 75 yards; he then punted four times for 141 yards the following game against the Cincinnati Bengals. However, he tore his hamstring against the Bengals and was then placed on injured reserve, ending his season. In two games, he punted six times for 216 yards, a 36-yard average. He later had knee surgery and then was released by the Packers prior to the start of the 1972 season. Duncan signed with the Cincinnati Bengals in 1973 and initially impressed, but was ultimately released prior to the regular season, in part due to recurring knee issues.

== Later life ==
Duncan married and had two daughters and a son. After his playing career, he worked as a coach at Ventura College, coaching punters and wide receivers, and coached basketball and football at St. Bonaventure High School in Ventura. He started a business, Unique Fitness, and worked as a personal trainer. He was inducted into the Carpinteria High School Warrior Hall of Fame in 1990 and into the Santa Barbara Athletic Round Table Hall of Fame in 2009.
