= St. Bonaventure, California =

St. Bonaventure, California in the English translation of San Buenaventura, California, commonly shortened to Ventura.

St. Bonaventure, California may also refer to:

== Education ==
- St. Bonaventure High School, a private, Catholic, co-educational secondary school in Ventura, California

== Other ==
- Westin Bonaventure Hotel, the largest hotel in Los Angeles, California
