= Pacifica High School (Oxnard, California) =

Public high school in California, United States

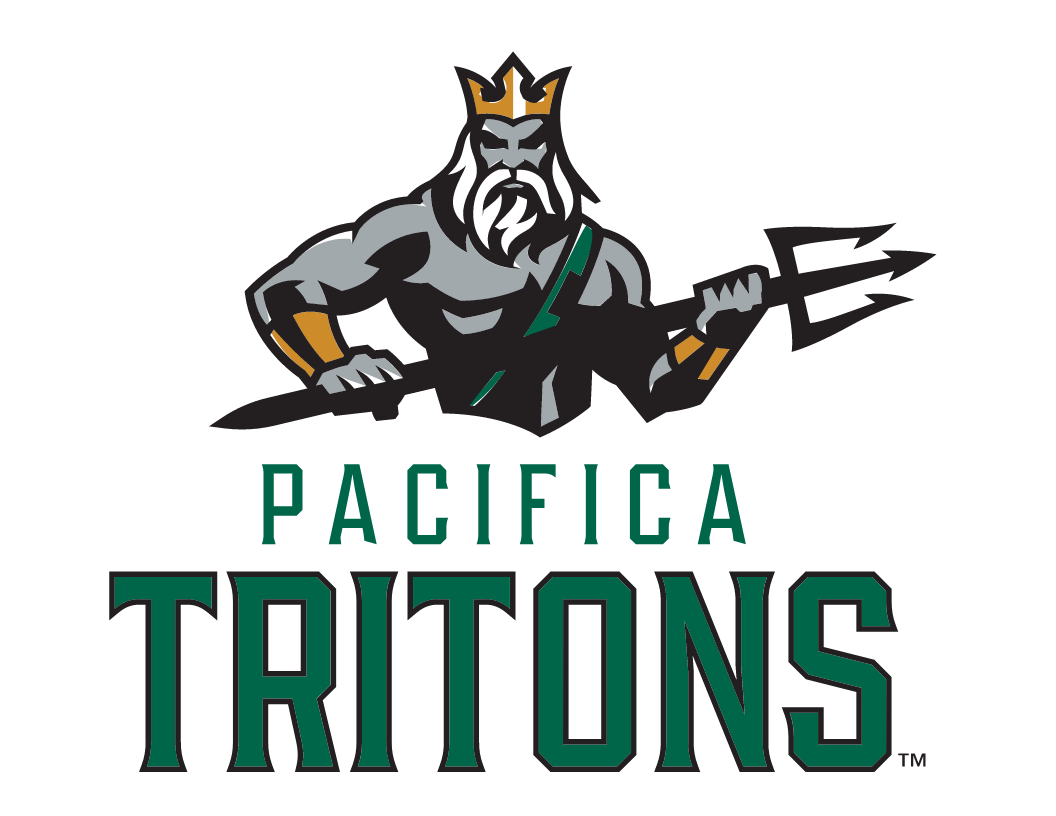

Location
- 600 East Gonzales Road; Oxnard, California 93036; United States
- 34°13′06″N 119°10′13″W

Information
- Type: Public
- Motto: It's good to be a Triton!
- Established: August 28, 2001
- School district: Oxnard Union High School District
- Principal: Chris Ramirez
- Teaching staff: 119.45 (FTE)
- Enrollment: 2,928 (2023-2024)
- Student to teacher ratio: 24.51
- Colors: Black, green and white
- Athletics conference: CIF Southern Section; Channel League
- Mascot: King Triton
- Nickname: Tritons
- Rival: Oxnard High School
- Accreditation: WASC
- Website: www.pacificahigh.us
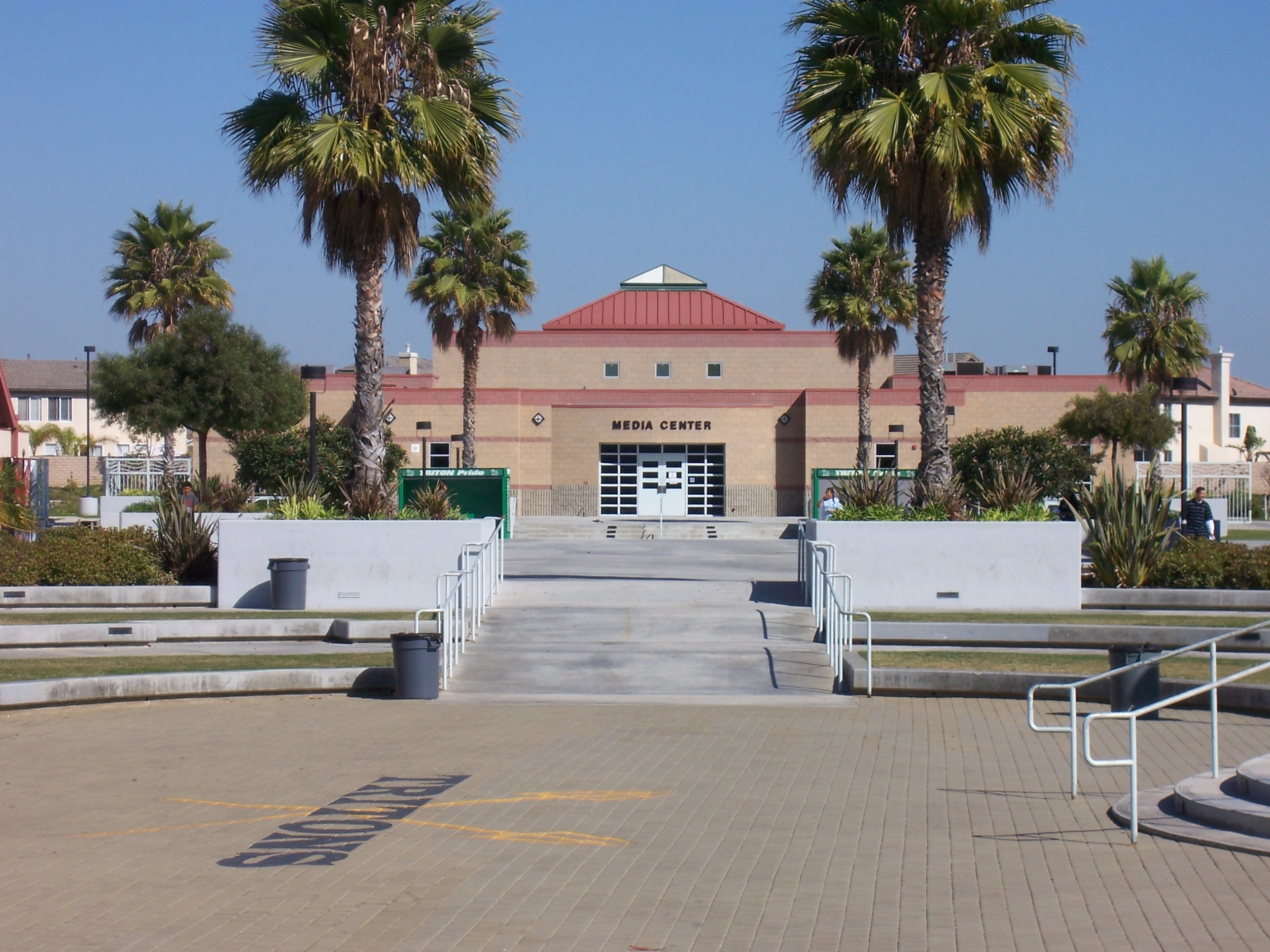
- Media center

Pacifica High School (PHS) is a public high school in Oxnard, California. The school is part of the Oxnard Union High School District and serves students in northeast and downtown Oxnard.

== History ==
In 1996, Oxnard Union High School District voters approved a $57 million school bond measure to finance construction of a new high school and improvements to existing campuses. Initially the Board of Trustees chose to name the campus Pacifico High School, shortened from Mar Pacifico (pacífico is Spanish for "peaceful"). Concerns soon arose that the new school shared its name with a brand of Mexican beer, so in 1999 the school board renamed the campus to Pacifica High School. The 50-acre (20 ha) campus was designed to accommodate up to 2,250 students, but by the 2018–19 school year the student population exceeded 3,000. Their current principal is Chris Ramirez.

== Demographics ==
The demographic breakdown of the 3,153 students enrolled for 2017–18 was:

- Male — 51%
- Female — 49%
- Asian — 4%
- Black — 1%
- Hispanic — 96%
- Native Hawaiian/Pacific Islander — 0.2%
- White — 1%
- Multiracial — 0.5%

75.7% of the students were eligible for free or reduced-cost lunch. During the 2017–18 school year, Pacifica was a Title I institution.

== Academics ==
Pacifica High School's Culinary Arts Academy prepares students for careers in the food and beverage industry and further education in culinary arts. Students enter national culinary and hospitality competitions including FCCLA. Graduating seniors in the program conclude their studies at PHS by creating a four-course menu for their graduation dinner.

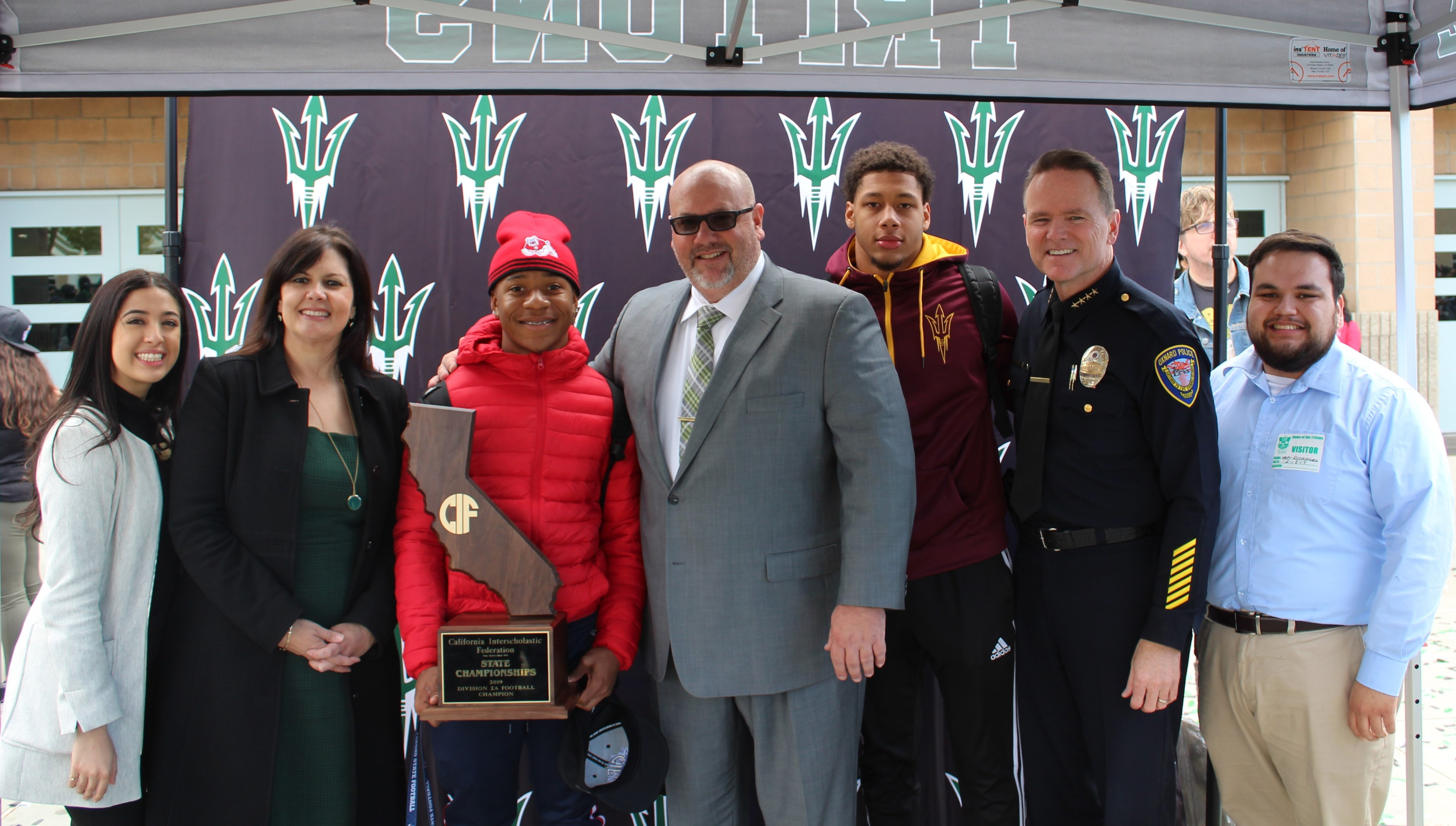
Pacific High School pep rally celebrating their state championship in 2020.

== Athletics ==
Pacifica High School athletic teams are nicknamed the Tritons. The school is a member of the CIF Southern Section and competes in the Pacific View League.

The Pacifica football team won its first California state football championship in 2019, defeating McClymonds High School of Oakland 34–6 in the CIF-State Division 2-A bowl game. It is the first-ever state championship for a public school football program in Ventura County (private schools St. Bonaventure and Grace Brethren previously won state titles). En route to the state bowl, the Tritons also captured a CIF-SS championship.

== Notable alumni ==
- Victor Ortiz, boxer
- Yadira Toraya, soccer player; midfielder for the Club Tijuana women's team
- Nohl Williams, football player
- Miguel Angel Garcia Cortez, boxer
