= Soane Toia =

Tongan gridiron football player (born 2002)

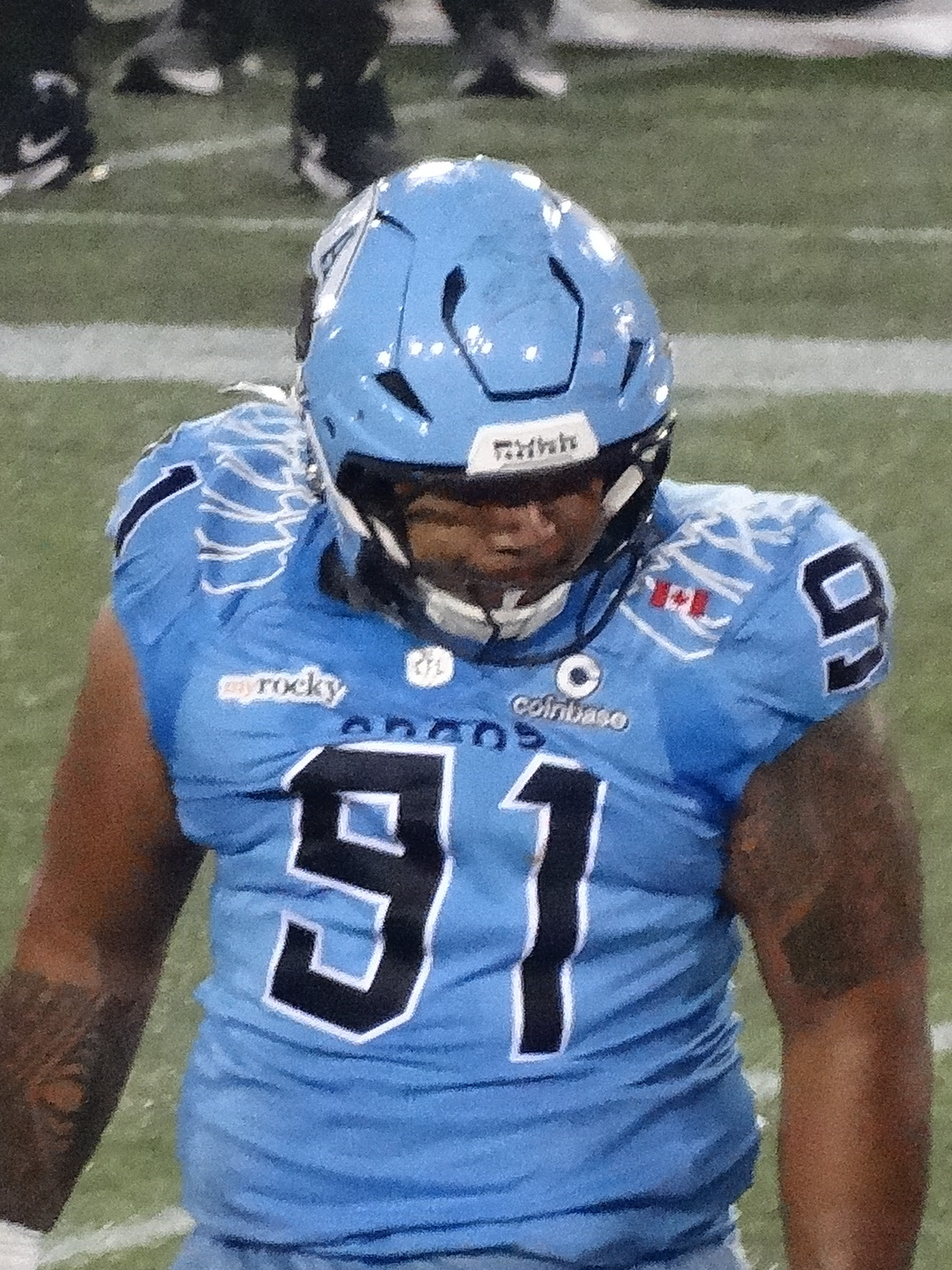
- Toia with the Toronto Argonauts in 2026

No. 91 – Toronto Argonauts
- Position: Defensive lineman
- Roster status: Active
- CFL status: Global

Personal information
- Born: February 16, 2002 (age 24); Nukuʻalofa, Tonga
- Listed height: 6 ft 0 in (1.83 m)
- Listed weight: 280 lb (127 kg)

Career information
- High school: Grace Brethren High
- College: San Jose State (2020–2024)
- CFL draft: 2025G: 2nd round, 18th overall pick

Career history
- 2026–present: Toronto Argonauts

Awards and highlights
- First-team All-MW (2024)
- Stats at CFL.ca

Soane Toia (born February 16, 2002) is a Tongan professional gridiron football defensive lineman for the Toronto Argonauts of the Canadian Football League (CFL).

== Early life ==
Toia was born in Tonga but moved with his family to Simi Valley, California in 2016 where he played high school football at Grace Brethren High School.

== College career ==
Toia played college football for the San Jose State Spartans from 2020 to 2024. He played in 57 games where he had 153 tackles, 26.5 tackles for loss, and 12 sacks.

== Professional career ==
Toia was selected in the second round, 18th overall, in the 2025 CFL global draft by the Toronto Argonauts. However, he did not play in 2025 and signed with the Argonauts on January 19, 2026. He earned a starting spot in training camp and played in his first CFL game on June 12, 2026, against the Montreal Alouettes where he recorded one defensive tackle and one special teams tackle.

== Personal life ==
Toia's brother Jay Toia was a defensive tackle at UCLA and is currently a defensive tackle for the Dallas Cowboys. His brother Siaki Ika was a defensive tackle at LSU and Baylor and is currently a defensive tackle for the Dallas Renegades, his cousin Stanley Ta'ufo'ou was a defensive lineman at USC and Toia's brother Abitoni is a rugby player in New Zealand.
