= Chris Gocong =

American football player (born 1983)

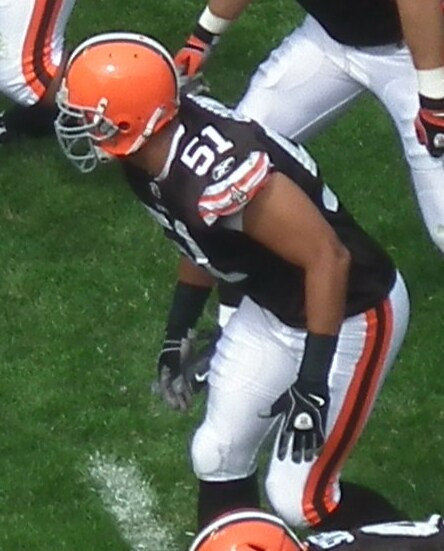
- Gocong with the Cleveland Browns in 2010

No. 57, 51
- Position: Linebacker

Personal information
- Born: November 16, 1983 (age 43); Lancaster, California, U.S.
- Listed height: 6 ft 2 in (1.88 m)
- Listed weight: 263 lb (119 kg)

Career information
- High school: Carpinteria (CA)
- College: Cal Poly
- NFL draft: 2006: 3rd round, 71st overall pick

Career history
- Philadelphia Eagles (2006−2009); Cleveland Browns (2010−2012)

Awards and highlights
- Buck Buchanan Award (2005); 2× FCS/Division I-AA All-American (2004, 2005)

Career NFL statistics
- Total tackles: 314
- Sacks: 9.5
- Forced fumbles: 5
- Fumble recoveries: 3
- Defensive touchdowns: 1
- Stats at Pro Football Reference

Christopher Andrew Gocong (born November 16, 1983) is an American artist and former professional football player who was a linebacker for the Philadelphia Eagles and Cleveland Browns in the National Football League (NFL). He was selected by the Eagles in the third round of the 2006 NFL draft. He played college football at Cal Poly in San Luis Obispo.

== Early life ==
Gocong attended Carpinteria High School in Carpinteria, California and was a letterman in football as a quarterback and linebacker. He also lettered in track and field. In football, as a linebacker, he posted 330 tackles over two years. In track and field, he was a two-time All-League honoree in the discus and shot put and set the school record in the discus (183' 3") in his junior year. Gocong was a two-time All-Tri-Valley League linebacker in football and a two-time All-CIF-Southern Section linebacker.

== College career ==
Gocong played college football at Cal Poly where he won the 2005 Buck Buchanan Award as college football's best I-AA defensive player, garnering 44 first-place ballots and 359 total voting points.

He saw limited action in six games during the 2001 season at Cal Poly, recording six tackles (three solo). He then redshirted in 2002 and started the 2003 campaign as the team's nose guard. Gocong totaled 37 tackles (20 solo) with a sack and eight stops for losses that year.

In 2005, Gocong set a Division I-AA single-season record with 23.5 sacks and led the nation with 31 tackles behind the line of scrimmage. He recorded a career-high 98 tackles, caused four fumbles, recovered two others and deflected four passes. He was voted a unanimous All-American.

In 41 career games with the Mustangs, Gocong started 35 times. He recorded 212 tackles as he set an NCAA career record with 42 sacks for minus-284 yards. His 61.5 stops for losses of 330 yards rank fourth in Division I-AA history. He recovered three fumbles and caused six others. He also intercepted a pass, deflected eight others and blocked a kick.

Gocong graduated from the university with a degree in biomedical engineering. He was inducted into the Cal Poly Hall of Fame in 2022 as part of the Mustangs' first class to be enshrined following return from the COVID-19 pandemic.

== Professional career ==
Pre-draft measurables
Height	Weight	Arm length	Hand span	40-yard dash	10-yard split	20-yard split	20-yard shuttle	Three-cone drill	Vertical jump	Broad jump	Bench press
6 ft 2 1/8 in (1.88 m)	263 lb (119 kg)	31 7/8 in (0.81 m)	9 1/2 in (0.24 m)	4.76 s	1.63 s	2.76 s	4.08 s	7.05 s	42.0 in (1.07 m)	10 ft 5 in (3.18 m)	28 reps
All values from NFL Combine/Pro Day

=== Philadelphia Eagles ===
Gocong was selected 71st overall in the third round of the 2006 NFL draft by the Philadelphia Eagles, but missed the entire 2006 season due to an injury suffered before the preseason. He made his NFL debut on September 9, 2007, where he started at the "Sam" linebacker position. He alternated snaps at defensive end and linebacker and recorded his first career sack (Tom Brady) on November 25, 2007, in the Eagles' road game at the New England Patriots. In all, Gocong played in all 16 games serving as the team's SAM linebacker, and recorded 92 tackles, one sack, four hurries and two passed defended. His seven tackles-for-losses ranked second on the team. Also recorded 11 special teams tackles. During the 2007 season, Gocong was the host of the Chris Gocong Show on ESPN 1450. The show was hosted by Mike Gill, live from Chickie's and Pete's in Egg Harbor Township, New Jersey.

In 2008, he finished tied for third on the team in special teams tackles with 19. He also had 61 total tackles, two sacks, four passes defensed a forced fumble and a fumble recovery as the Eagles starting strongside linebacker.

In the first seven games of the 2009 season, Gocong started at his normal position at "Sam" linebacker. He was inactive in week 8 against the Dallas Cowboys due to a hamstring injury suffered the week before against the New York Giants. Due to injuries at the middle linebacker position, Gocong started his first game at middle linebacker against the San Diego Chargers in week 9. In week 14, he lost his starting "Sam" linebacker job to rookie Moise Fokou.

He was re-signed to a one-year contract on March 30, 2010.

=== Cleveland Browns ===
On April 2, 2010, Gocong was traded, along with cornerback Sheldon Brown to the Cleveland Browns in exchange for linebacker Alex Hall, and 4th and 5th round draft picks in the 2010 NFL draft. On August 4, 2012, during a training camp practice, Gocong was lost for the 2012 season due to a right Achilles tendon rupture that required surgery.

=== NFL statistics ===
Year	Team	GP	TACKLES	SOLO	AST	SACK	FF	FR	FR YDS	FR TD	INT	PD
2007	PHI	16	66	51	15	1.0	0	0	0	0	0	1
2008	PHI	16	59	43	16	2.0	1	1	0	1	0	5
2009	PHI	15	44	35	9	1.0	1	0	0	0	0	2
2010	CLE	16	75	50	25	2.0	1	1	0	0	0	3
2011	CLE	16	70	49	21	3.5	2	1	0	0	0	3
Career		79	314	228	86	9.5	5	3	0	1	0	14

Key

- GP: games played
- SOLO: solo tackles
- AST: assisted tackles
- SACK: sacks
- FF: forced fumbles
- FR: fumble recoveries
- FR YDS: fumble return yards
- INT: interceptions
- PD: passes defensed

== Artistry ==
Post-football, Gocong became an accomplished painter. In the fall of 2022, his work was displayed at Kate Oh Gallery's "Let There Be Light" exhibit on Madison Avenue in New York.

== Personal life ==
Gocong is of Filipino, Pacific Islander, Native American, German, and French descent.
