= Louis Leithold =

American mathematician (1924–2005)

- Born: November 16, 1924; San Francisco, California, US
- Died: April 29, 2005 (aged 80); Los Angeles, California, US
- Known for: The Calculus
- Scientific career
- Fields: mathematics (calculus)
- Institutions: Malibu High School

Louis Leithold (San Francisco, United States, 16 November 1924 – Los Angeles, 29 April 2005) was an American mathematician and teacher. He is best known for authoring The Calculus, a classic textbook about calculus that changed the teaching methods for calculus in world high schools and universities. Known as "a legend in AP calculus circles," Leithold was the mentor of Jaime Escalante, the Los Angeles high-school teacher whose story is the subject of the 1988 movie Stand and Deliver.

== Biography ==
Leithold attended the University of California, Berkeley, where is attained his B.A., M.A. and PhD. He went on to teach at Phoenix College (Arizona) (which has a math scholarship in his name), California State University, Los Angeles, the University of Southern California, Pepperdine University, and The Open University (UK). In 1968, Leithold published The Calculus, a "blockbuster best-seller" which simplified the teaching of calculus.

At age 72, after his retirement from Pepperdine, he began teaching calculus at Malibu High School, in Malibu, California, drilling his students for the Advanced Placement Calculus, and achieving considerable success. He regularly assigned two hours of homework per night, and had two training sessions at his own house that ran Saturdays or Sundays from 9AM to 4PM before the AP test. His teaching methods were praised for their liveliness, and his love for the topic was well known. He also taught workshops for calculus teachers. One of the people he influenced was Jaime Escalante, who taught math to minority students at Garfield High School in East Los Angeles. Escalante's subsequent success as a teacher is portrayed in the 1988 film Stand and Deliver.

Leithold died of natural causes the week before his class (which he had been "relentlessly drilling" for eight months) was to take the AP exam; his students went on to receive top scores. A memorial service was held in Glendale, and a scholarship established in his name.

Leithold experienced a notable legal event in his personal life in 1959 when he and his then-wife, musician Dr. Thyra N. Pliske, adopted a minor child, Gordon Marc Leithold. The couple eventually divorced in 1962, with an Arizona court granting Thyra custody of the child and Louis receiving certain visitation rights. Thyra later married Gilbert Norman Plass, and the family moved to Dallas, Texas in 1963.

In 1965, Louis filed a suit against his former wife and her new husband in the Juvenile Court of Dallas County, Texas. The suit, titled "Application for Modification of Visitation and Custody," sought significant changes to the Arizona decree based on allegations of changed conditions and circumstances. Following a hearing, the Dallas court modified the Arizona decree with respect to Louis' visitation rights. His son would die in 1994, at the age of 35 in Houston, Texas.

He was an art collector, and had art by Vasa Mihich. He also used art in his Calculus book by Patrick Caulfield.
