= Jay Toia =

American football player (born 2003)

Profile
- Position: Defensive tackle

Personal information
- Born: July 16, 2003 (age 23); Inglewood, California, U.S.
- Listed height: 6 ft 2 in (1.88 m)
- Listed weight: 340 lb (154 kg)

Career information
- High school: Grace Brethren (Simi Valley, California)
- College: USC (2021); UCLA (2021–2024)
- NFL draft: 2025: 7th round, 217th overall pick

Career history
- Dallas Cowboys (2025); Arizona Cardinals (2026)*
- * Offseason or practice squad member only

Career NFL statistics as of 2025
- Games played: 5
- Stats at Pro Football Reference

Jay Toia (born July 16, 2003) is an American professional football defensive tackle. He played college football for the USC Trojans and UCLA Bruins. Toia was selected by the Cowboys in the seventh round of the 2025 NFL draft.

== Early life ==
Toia attended Grace Brethren High School in Simi Valley, California. He was rated as a four-star recruit and committed to play college football for the USC Trojans.

== College career ==
=== USC ===
Toia spent spring practices with the Trojans as an early enrolled player in 2021. After spending just a few months with the Trojans, he entered his name into the NCAA transfer portal.

=== UCLA ===
Toia joined the UCLA Bruins before the start of the 2021 season, after spending the summer as a Trojan. In the 2022 Sun Bowl, he notched a career-high 10 tackles with two for a loss against Pittsburgh.

In his first two collegiate seasons in 2021 and 2022, Toia notched 38 tackles with three for a loss, a sack, and a forced fumble. In 2023, he appeared in all 13 games for the Bruins while making 12 starts, where he notched 28 tackles with four for a loss and a sack.

After the season, Toia entered his name into the NCAA transfer portal. Shortly after, he decided to return to play for the Bruins. In 2024, Toia totaled 25 tackles with two being for a loss, and a sack.

== Professional career ==
Toia accepted an invite to play in the 2025 East-West Shrine Bowl.

Pre-draft measurables
Height	Weight	Arm length	Hand span	Wingspan	20-yard shuttle	Three-cone drill	Vertical jump
6 ft 2 in (1.88 m)	342 lb (155 kg)	32 1/2 in (0.83 m)	10 in (0.25 m)	6 ft 4 3/8 in (1.94 m)	4.82 s	7.96 s	24.5 in (0.62 m)
All values from NFL Combine/Pro Day

=== Dallas Cowboys ===
Toia was selected by the Dallas Cowboys in the 7th round (217th overall) of the 2025 NFL draft. The defensive tackle position experienced changes during the season with the additions of Kenny Clark and Quinnen Williams, who were integrated into a group that already had Osa Odighizuwa and Solomon Thomas. There weren’t many defensive snaps left for Toia after he appeared in the first two games and he would only be active in 3 additional contests the rest of the season.

In 2026, the Cowboys hired defensive coordinator Christian Parker and Toia also faced heavy competition as he was part of a deep group on the defensive line. On August 30, 2026, he was waived by the Cowboys as a part of final roster cuts.

=== Arizona Cardinals ===
On September 23, 2026, Toia was signed to the Arizona Cardinals' practice squad. He was released on October 13.

== Personal life ==
Toia's brother Siaki Ika was a defensive tackle at LSU and is currently a defensive tackle for the Kansas City Chiefs. His brother Soane Toia was a defensive lineman at San Jose State and is currently a defensive lineman for the Toronto Argonauts, his cousin Stanley Ta'ufo'ou was a defensive lineman at USC and Toia's brother Abitoni is a rugby player in New Zealand. Toia's uncle, Chris Maumalanga, played in 14 games for the New York Giants and Arizona Cardinals from 1994 to 1996.
