= Malibu High School =

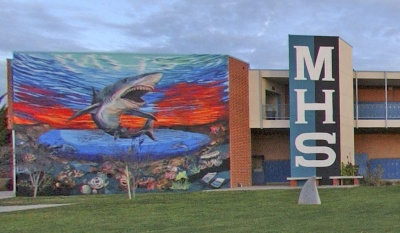

Location
- 30215 Morning View Drive; Malibu, California 90265; United States; 34.02442°N 118.82696°W

Information
- Type: Public
- Established: 1992; 34 years ago
- School district: Santa Monica–Malibu Unified School District
- NCES School ID: 063570002173
- Principal: Adam Almeida
- Faculty: 26.72 (FTE)
- Grades: 9–12
- Enrollment: 387 (2024-2025)
- Student to teacher ratio: 14.48
- Campus: Suburban
- Colors: Teal and black
- Mascot: Mako shark
- Nickname: Sharks
- Newspaper: The Current
- Yearbook: Aquarius
- Magazine: The Undertow
- Website: malibu.smmusd.org

Malibu High School (MHS) is a public high school in Malibu, California. The school is one of three high schools in the Santa Monica–Malibu Unified School District and serves students in the city of Malibu and surrounding communities.

== Location ==
The school is located in the northwestern part of Malibu, one block from the Pacific Ocean and Zuma Beach in the Malibu Park district. Its address is on Morning View Drive, made famous by the breakout album by Incubus. The school spans 35 acres (0.14 km^{2}) of rolling hillsides between Merritt Drive to the south, Via Cabrillo Street to the north, and Harvester Road to the east. The campus is located next to Malibu Methodist Preschool & Nursery, a private pre-kindergarten school for ages 0–5.

The school is accessible via the LA Metro bus line 134.

== History ==
Malibu High School is on land that was originally part of Juan Cabrillo Elementary School. That campus was partitioned in 1963 to create Malibu Park Junior High School, named after its surrounding region in Malibu. With no public secondary school in Malibu, upon promotion from middle school the high school students commuted two hours roundtrip to Santa Monica to attend Santa Monica High School.

In 1992, the district converted the Malibu Park Junior High School campus to its present combined middle school/high school, and allowed MHS's first freshman class to walk onto campus. The State of California erroneously shows the high school established in 1993. Classes were added every succeeding year, culminating in the original freshman class graduating in 1996.

The high school's first principal was Michael Matthews. Under Matthews's tenure in 2003, the school earned its designation as a California Distinguished School and first achieved a national ranking as #177 in Newsweek's Top 1200 Schools in America, a ranking system based on what percentage of a school's student body takes Advanced Placement exams in any given year. In 2007, MHS made the U.S. News & World Report list of the top 100 schools in the United States, ranking #98.

Malibu High School saw some controversies in the 2000s. With the rise of social media, the school was featured in a 2007 CBS News story about students posting videos of teachers on YouTube. In 2008, incidents of vandalism caused a stir with racial implications. Palm trees on campus were removed in 2009.

== Demographics ==
In 2025, MHS had 387 students in grades 9-12. The school was 2.8% Asian, 0.3% Native American, 16.3% Hispanic or Latino, 1.6% African American, 72.1% White, and 6.7% of two or more races.

For the 2007–08 school year, MHS's teacher composition included:

- High school: 64 certificated teachers; 53.1% male, 46.9% female
- High school: Certificated teacher demographics: 6.2% Hispanic or Latino, 4.7% African American, 87.5% White (non-Hispanic), 1.6% Multiple.

== Environmental concerns ==
The Santa Monica–Malibu Unified School District had performed a polychlorinated biphenyls (PCB) cleanup of the school in 2009 and 2010 with the California Department of Toxic Substance Control (DTSC) advising. In October 2013, after three teachers developed thyroid cancer, a group of teachers grew concerned that environmental contaminants at Malibu High School may be to blame; caulk tested for PCB showed levels "slightly elevated" above the regulatory limit of 50ppm in November 2013. The three relevant government agencies, the DTSC, Los Angeles County Department of Public Health and the U.S. Environmental Protection Agency (EPA) were informed and certain buildings were closed to students.

According to various documents and interviews with local residents who were present during World War II, the Malibu High School site served as a military training center during that war. Upon recommendation of Hugh Kaufman, a senior EPA policy analyst, teachers approached Public Employees for Environmental Responsibility (PEER) for help. In February 2014, PEER attorneys wrote to the school district asking for a site assessment of the campus. The U.S. Army Corps of Engineers responded in July 2014 that the school had never been a military site. The District hired an environmental firm named Environ, whose initial clean up plan was criticized for allowing elevated PCB levels to remain inside classrooms for 15 years or more, for not testing caulk in all rooms built prior to 1979 and for air quality monitoring of only one year. The plan was rejected by the EPA in April 2014. Environ released a second PCB clean up plan on July 3, 2014. Two weeks later PEER published PCB test results of caulking and dirt from rooms sampled in June, and not previously tested by the District, "at thousands of times the levels previously released to the public".

== Academics ==
Malibu High School consistently ranks the highest in SAT and API scores among its district's three high schools. MHS has periodically been awarded honors by various ranking authorities; As of 2007 Newsweek Magazine's Top 1200 Schools in America ranked Malibu High #184. In 2007, U.S. News & World Report ranked Malibu High #98 of the top 100 schools in the country and awarded a gold medal. Over fifteen Advanced Placement courses are offered at the school.

Besides regular college-preparatory, honors, and Advanced Placement courses, the school is one of a handful in California that provides extensive resources for Special Education (SpEd) students. As of July 2006, 125 SpEd students were enrolled with 26 SpEd faculty at MHS, where roughly 10% of the student body are receiving 24% of the school's instructors.

=== Performing arts ===
Malibu High School has won several awards in instrumental and choral music. In 2011, all four MHS choirs received "Superior" ratings (the highest rating possible). In March 2014, the Malibu High School chorale choir performed at Carnegie Hall in New York. In the summer of 2016, the MHS Orchestra performed at Carnegie Hall.

=== Publications ===
The school's monthly newspaper is known as The Current, and the yearbook is called Aquarius. The Inkblot, a literary magazine, was added in 2008, showcasing student stories, poetry, cartoons, and illustrations; it was relaunched in 2016 as The Undertow.

== Athletics ==
Malibu High School athletic teams are nicknamed the Sharks, and the mascot, a grinning Mako shark, was designed by an art student in the first graduating class of 1996. The school is a charter member of the Citrus Coast League, a conference within the CIF Southern Section that was established in 2018. Prior to that, Malibu was part of the Tri-County Athletic Association. A study published in 2007 by the MHS Site Governance Council reported that 75% of all honors and AP enrolled students participate in the school's sports programs.

In 2019, the school switched its 11-man football program to an eight-man format. As a result, the school no longer competes in the Citrus Coast League in that sport.

== Notable alumni ==
- Devendra Banhart, musician
- Jesse Billauer, motivational speaker and surfer
- Colbie Caillat, musician
- Caroline D'Amore, model, DJ and actress
- Lauren Dukoff, photographer
- Caitlin Gerard, actress
- Kaia Gerber, model
- Taylor Goldsmith, musician
- Bella Hadid, model
- Gigi Hadid, model
- Brody Jenner, television personality
- Burt Jenner, off-road racing driver
- Chloe Rose Lattanzi, actress
- Blake Mills, musician
- India Oxenberg, film producer
- Henry Stern, California State Senator
- Johnny Strange (adventurer), BASE jumper and mountaineer
- Dominique Swain, actress
- Jordan Wilimovsky, Olympic swimmer

== Notable faculty ==
- Louis Leithold, author of The Calculus, a widely used high school and college textbook
