= Siaki Ika =

American football player (born 2000)

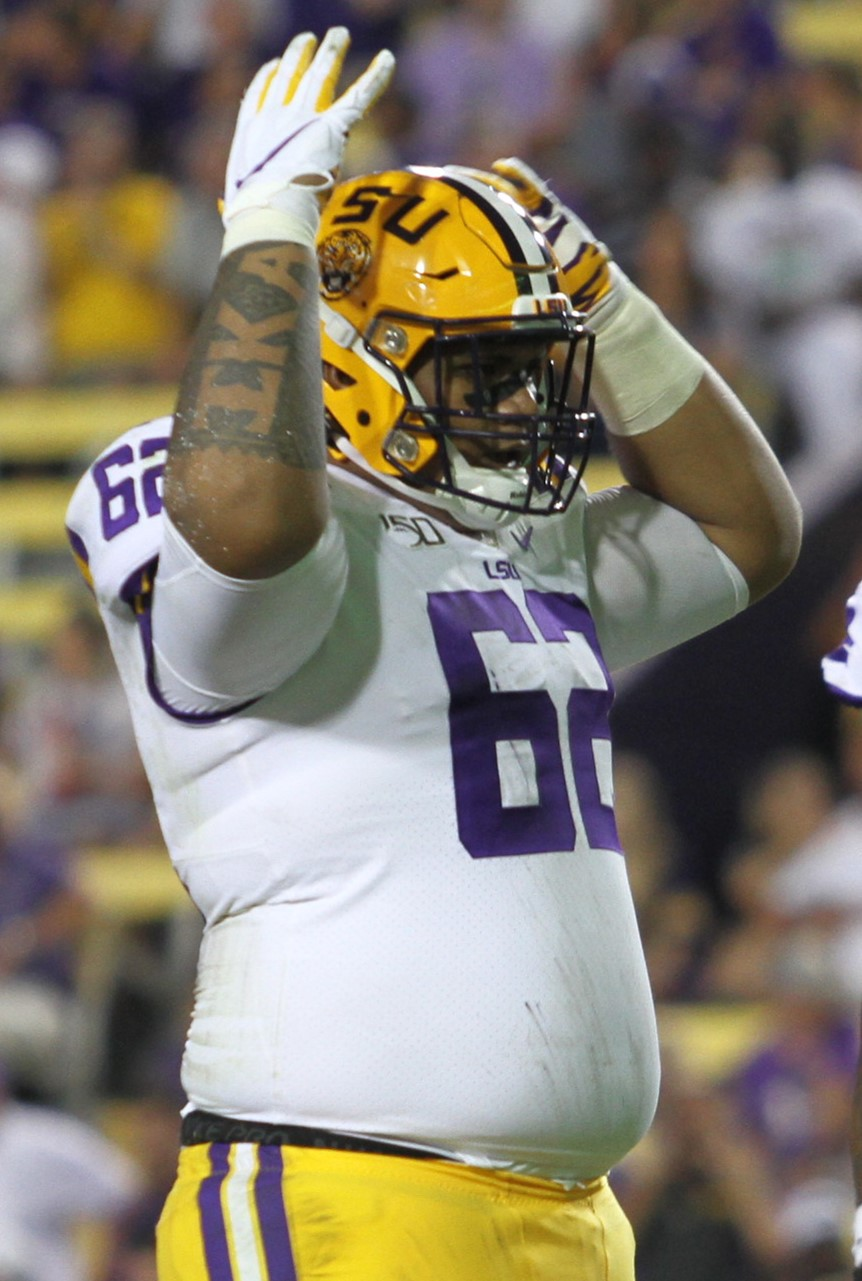
- Ika with the LSU Tigers in 2019

No. 63 – Colorado Stampede
- Position: Defensive tackle
- Roster status: Active

Personal information
- Born: November 7, 2000 (age 25); Salt Lake City, Utah, U.S.
- Listed height: 6 ft 3 in (1.91 m)
- Listed weight: 347 lb (157 kg)

Career information
- High school: East (Salt Lake City)
- College: LSU (2019–2020); Baylor (2021–2022)
- NFL draft: 2023: 3rd round, 98th overall pick

Career history
- Cleveland Browns (2023–2024); Philadelphia Eagles (2024)*; Kansas City Chiefs (2024)*; Dallas Renegades (2026); Colorado Stampede (2027–present)
- * Offseason or practice squad member only

Awards and highlights
- CFP national champion (2019); Big 12 Defensive Newcomer of the Year (2021); 2× first-team All-Big 12 (2021, 2022)
- Stats at Pro Football Reference

Siaki Ika (born November 7, 2000) is an American professional football defensive tackle for the Colorado Stampede of the United Football League (UFL). He played college football for the LSU Tigers, where he was a member of the team that won the 2020 College Football Playoff National Championship, before transferring to Baylor the following season.

== Early life ==
Ika grew up in Salt Lake City, Utah and attended East High School. He initially committed to play college football at BYU, but later re-opened his recruitment. Ika ultimately committed to play at LSU over offers from Florida, Oregon, USC, and Utah.

== College career ==
Ika joined the LSU Tigers as an early enrollee in January 2019. He played in 13 games as part of the Tigers' defensive line rotation during his freshman year as the Tigers won the 2020 College Football Playoff National Championship. Ika entered the NCAA transfer portal after playing in the first three games of his sophomore season in 2020.

Ika ultimately transferred to Baylor for the 2021 season. He also considered offers from Utah, Oregon, BYU, and Georgia. Ika recorded 24 tackles with six tackles for loss and four sacks in his first season at Baylor and was named the Big 12 Conference Defensive Newcomer of the Year and second team All-Big 12.

== Professional career ==
Pre-draft measurables
Height	Weight	Arm length	Hand span	Wingspan	40-yard dash	10-yard split	20-yard split	20-yard shuttle	Three-cone drill
6 ft 2 7/8 in (1.90 m)	335 lb (152 kg)	32 3/8 in (0.82 m)	10 1/4 in (0.26 m)	6 ft 3 7/8 in (1.93 m)	5.39 s	1.88 s	3.08 s	4.99 s	7.80 s
All values from NFL Combine

=== Cleveland Browns ===
Ika was selected by the Cleveland Browns in the third round, 98th overall, of the 2023 NFL draft.

On August 27, 2024, Ika was waived by the Browns, and later re-signed to the practice squad. He was released on October 15.

=== Philadelphia Eagles ===
On October 23, 2024, Ika signed with the Philadelphia Eagles practice squad, but was released a week later. He was signed to the practice squad on November 20, but released a week later.

=== Kansas City Chiefs ===
On December 13, 2024, Ika signed with the Kansas City Chiefs practice squad. He signed a reserve/future contract with Kansas City on February 11, 2025. On June 11, Ika was waived by the Chiefs.

=== Dallas Renegades ===
On January 12, 2026, Ika was allocated to the Dallas Renegades in the UFL regional allocation.

== Personal life ==
Ika's brother Jay Toia was a defensive tackle at UCLA and is currently a defensive tackle for the Dallas Cowboys. His brother Soane Toia was a defensive lineman at San Jose State and is currently a defensive lineman for the Toronto Argonauts, his cousin Stanley Ta'ufo'ou was a defensive lineman at USC and Toia's brother Apitoni is a rugby player in New Zealand.
