= Fillmore Unified School District =

School district in Ventura County, California

Address
- 627 Sespe Avenue Fillmore, California, 93016; United States

District information
- Type: Public
- Grades: K–12
- NCES District ID: 0613800

Students and staff
- Students: 3,626 (2020–2021)
- Teachers: 164.86 (FTE)
- Staff: 241.54 (FTE)
- Student–teacher ratio: 21.99:1

Other information
- Website: www.fillmoreusd.org

Fillmore Unified School District is a public school district in the city of Fillmore, in the Santa Clara River Valley and Ventura County, California.

In 1985 several area parents asked for English to be the sole language of instruction, including Mexican Americans, while the school district wanted most children in bilingual English-Spanish classes for fear of having Spanish speakers isolated from English speakers.

== Schools ==
Secondary:

- Fillmore High School
- Sierra High School
- Fillmore Middle School

Primary:

- Mountain Vista Elementary School
- Piru Elementary School (Piru)
- Rio Vista Elementary School
- San Cayetano Elementary School

Other:

- Fillmore Adult School

== See also ==
- Castaic Union School District
- Santa Paula Unified School District
