= St. Bonaventure High School =

Saint Bonaventure High School

Location
- 3167 Telegraph Road; Ventura, California 93003; United States; 34°16′23″N 119°15′13″W

Information
- Type: Private, coeducational
- Motto: "Soli Deo Honor Et Gloria" (Only for the Honor and Glory of God)
- Religious affiliation: Roman Catholic
- Patron saint: Saint Bonaventure
- Established: 1963
- Authority: Archdiocese of Los Angeles
- Oversight: Archdiocese of Los Angeles
- Principal: Christina Castro
- Staff: 6
- Faculty: 27 (2014)
- Grades: 9–12
- Enrollment: 541 (2021)
- Average class size: 22
- Student to teacher ratio: 22:1
- Education system: United States Council of Bishops, California State Standards
- Campus: SBHS
- Campus type: Suburban
- Colors: Green and gold
- Slogan: Soli Deo Honor et Gloria
- Fight song: Firmly standing true and faithful to the Green and Gold
- Athletics conference: CIF Southern Section; Tri-County Athletic Association
- Mascot: Seraph
- Nickname: Seraphs
- Rival: Oaks Christian School; Bishop Diego High School
- Accreditation: Western Association of Schools and Colleges WCEA
- Newspaper: Seraph Scrolls
- Yearbook: The Arches
- Tuition: $10,076 (2021–22)
- Communities served: Ventura County
- Feeder schools: Our Lady of Assumption, Ventura Missionary, Sacred Heart, St. Mary Magdalen, St. Sebastian, Santa Clara, Holy Cross
- Affiliation: WASC, WCEA, CSF, NHS
- Website: sbhsvta.org

St. Bonaventure High School is a private, Catholic, co-educational secondary school in Ventura, California, United States. This college preparatory institution was founded on the spiritual ideals of St. Francis of Assisi and the academic fervor of its namesake, St. Bonaventure. The nearby Mission San Buenaventura was founded by the Franciscan order in 1782 and was also named after Saint Bonaventure. The school's mascot, the Seraph, was derived from one of the titles of Bonaventure, "Seraphic Doctor".

== Accreditation ==
Saint Bonaventure High School is accredited by the Western Association of Schools and Colleges (WASC) and the Western Catholic Educational Association (WCEA). On February 22, 2015, a WASC/WCEA accrediting committee arrived at Saint Bonaventure to begin a three-day process of observation, interviews, and goal-setting. Saint Bonaventure High School, as a result of the committee's recommendation, again received a six-year accreditation in June 2015, the longest term of accreditation that can be granted.

== History ==
The Roman Catholic Archdiocese of Los Angeles founded the school in 1963 with 70 students. Over the years, members of both the Sisters of Notre Dame and the Franciscan order have provided leadership and instruction. In 1782 Father Junipero Serra established a mission in the area now known as Ventura, naming the mission San Buenaventura, after the Franciscan priest and scholar Bonaventure. Over the next 100 years, people began to move to and live in the area around the mission, and in 1887 the city of San Buenaventura was formed.

In 1963 St. Bonaventure High School was established in the city of San Buenaventura, more popularly known now as the city of Ventura. The school was named in honor of St. Bonaventure, the patron of the city, whose work as a philosopher and theologian during the Middle Ages earned him the title of Seraphic Doctor; hence the school mascot of Seraph, the highest order of angels.

St. Bonaventure's first student body consisted of 70 freshmen that started classes in partially completed buildings in September 1963. The teaching staff, headed by Sister Mary St. Lawrence, was composed of five Sisters of Notre Dame, with lay men and women to supplement the faculty as needed. In September 1966 the Franciscan Brothers were added to the faculty and administration.

In September 1966, St. Bonaventure became a complete four-year co-educational high school with an enrollment of 264 students. Reverend Thomas Meskill became the new Principal, serving from 1966 to 1976. The school's Alma Mater, composed by Claire Miller of Santa Paula, one of the school's original graduates, was sung for the first time in the 1966/67 school year.

Father Meskill was followed as principal by Brother Hilarion O’Connor from 1976 to 1979. Brother Thomas Fahy became Principal in September 1979 and was succeeded by Brother Paulinus Horkan, Principal from 1986 to 2007. Mr. Marc Groff was appointed the first lay Principal in the school's history in May 2007. Under their guidance, the school grew in enrollment, curriculum, and facilities, displaying excellence in academics, athletics, and service to the community.

Mrs. Christina Castro (Class of 1986) was selected by the Department of Catholic Schools to be Principal in June 2019 and will continue to guide the school's growth and maintain Saint Bonaventure High School's excellence in academic, extra-curricular, service and athletics programs.

Currently, approximately 440 students from all areas of Ventura County and southern Santa Barbara County attend Saint Bonaventure High School.

== Academics ==
Classes are rigorous and comprehensive to meet California state requirements and recommendations for admission to the University of California and California State University systems. Religious instruction is required of every student for each year of attendance. St. Bonaventure's mission statement reads: "Graduates are prepared to live their lives spiritually, intellectually and socially to meet the challenges encountered in their lives". Ninety-nine percent of the school's graduates go on to attend college, and 90 percent complete a college education.

Saint Bonaventure also provides membership to the National Honor Society and the California Scholarship Federation

== Athletics ==
St. Bonaventure High School athletic teams are nicknamed the Seraphs. The school is a member of the CIF Southern Section (CIF-SS), competing in the Tri-County Athletic Association for all sports except football and in the Marmonte Football Association for football. SBHS is known for its many state and section championships, particularly in football.

The Seraphs girls' soccer team won CIF-SS championships in 1998 (shared with Maranatha High School of Pasadena) and 2021.

The St. Bonaventure softball team won CIF-SS titles in 2014, 2015, and 2021.

=== Football ===
From 2002 to 2009, the St. Bonaventure football team competed in the Channel League as the only private school among six members. During that time, the Seraphs won every league game. However, the team was forced to forfeit its undefeated league championship in 2009 due to the use of an ineligible player.

For the 2010 season, St. Bonaventure and rival private school Oaks Christian School were placed into the Marmonte League for football, a grouping consisting mostly of large public schools. The Seraphs continued their success, sharing the 2010 league title with Oaks Christian and Westlake High School, all with identical 8-1 conference records.

St. Bonaventure won two California state football championships back to back in 2007 and 2008. The Seraphs also hold ten CIF Southern Section championships dating back to 1968.

- CIF-State
  - Division III — 2007, 2008
- CIF-SS — 1968
  - Division XI — 1996, 1999, 2000, 2001
  - Division IV — 2002, 2004, 2005
  - Division III — 2007, 2008

== Notable alumni ==
- Rosanne Cash, 1973, singer/songwriter and author
- Lorenzo Booker, 2002, football player (2001 Hall Trophy winner)
- Steve Hawkins, college basketball coach
- Whitney Lewis, 2003, football player
- Darrell Scott, 2008, football player
- Troy Hill, 2010, football player
- Darius Vines, 2016, MLB pitcher
- Patrick Weigel, 2012, MLB pitcher

== Gallery ==
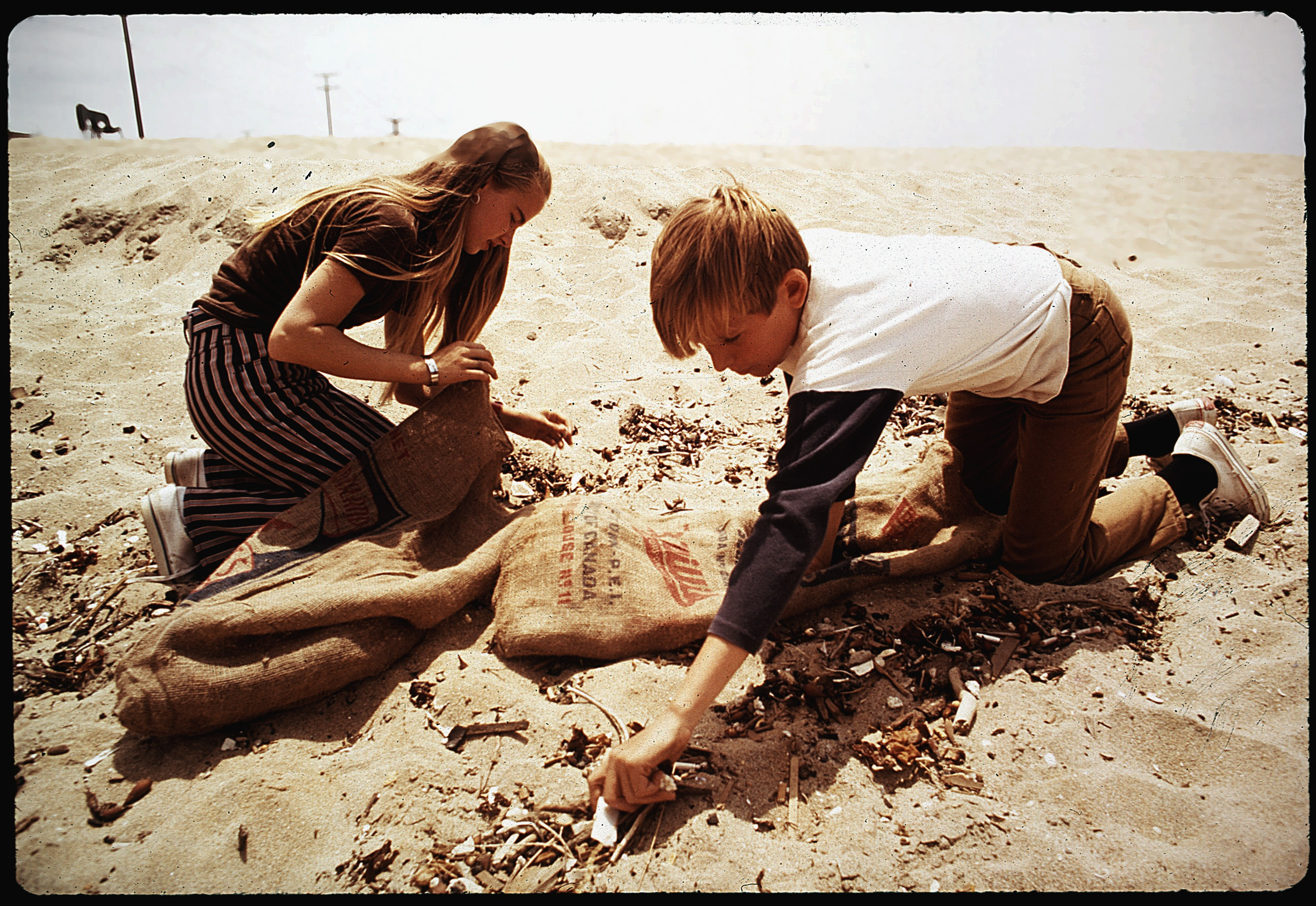
Two eighth grade students picking up the beach during recess, 1972

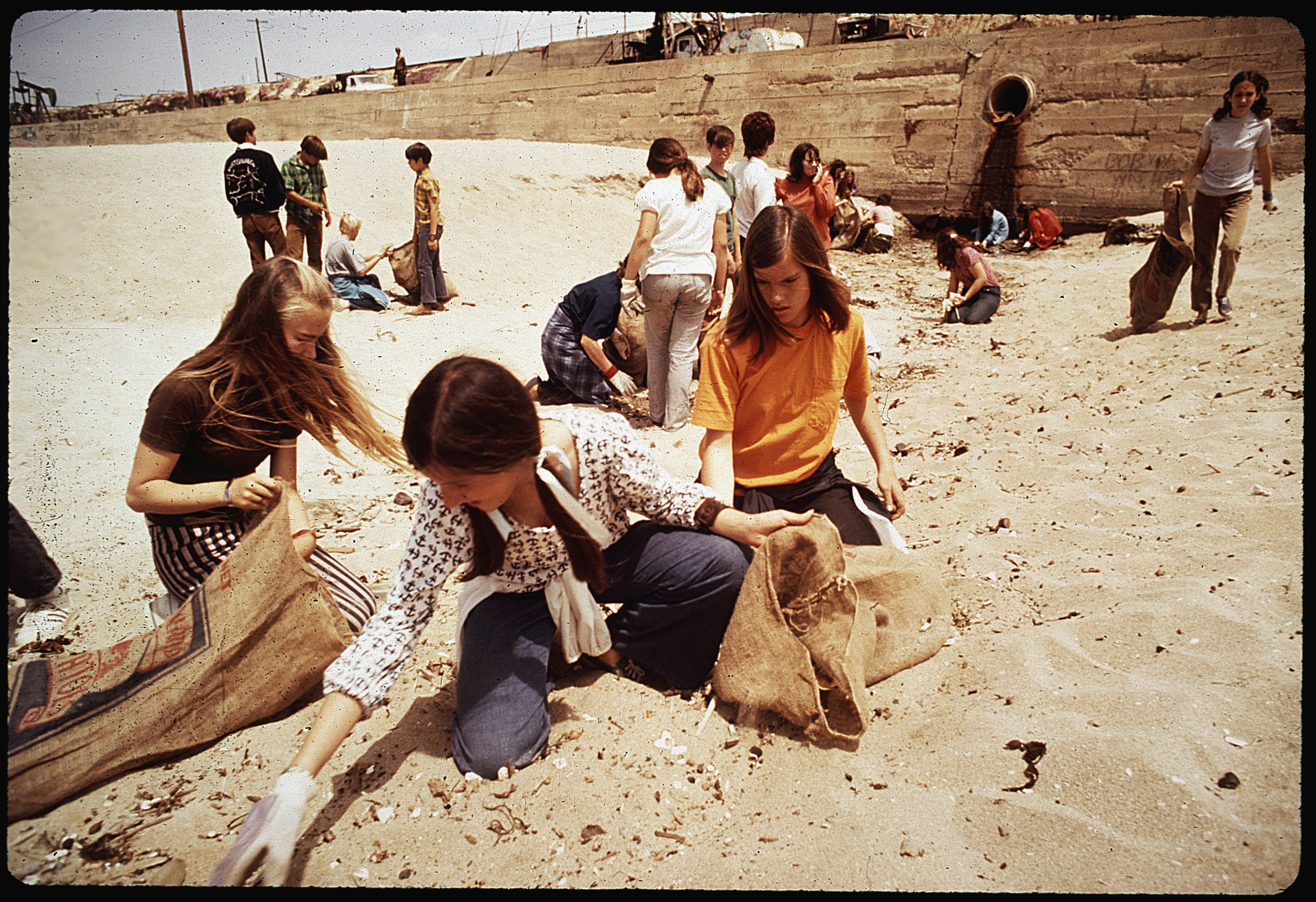
Eighth grade girls picking up the beach during recess, 1972
