= Hueneme High School =

Public high school in California, United States

Location
- 500 West Bard Road; Oxnard, California 93033; United States
- Coordinates: 34°09′35″N 119°10′56″W

Information
- Type: Public
- Motto: Once a Viking, always a Viking
- Established: 1959; 67 years ago
- School district: Oxnard Union High School District
- Principal: Brenda Bravo
- Teaching staff: 87.94 (FTE)
- Grades: 9–12
- Enrollment: 1,913 (2024–2025)
- Student to teacher ratio: 21.75
- Campus: Urban
- Colors: Red and White
- Athletics conference: CIF Southern Section; Citrus Coast League
- Nickname: Vikings
- Rival: Channel Islands High School
- Newspaper: The Voyager
- Website: www.huenemehigh.us

Hueneme High School (HHS) (/waɪˈniːmiː/ wy-NEEM-ee) is a public high school in Oxnard, California. The school is part of the Oxnard Union High School District and serves students in the southern portion of the city of Oxnard and most of Port Hueneme including part of Naval Base Ventura County.

== History ==
Hueneme High School was established in 1959.

On June 4, 2016, during that year's election season, U.S. presidential candidate Hillary Clinton held a campaign rally inside the school's gymnasium.

== Academics ==
Hueneme High School has hosted a Navy JROTC program since 1993.

== Athletics ==
Hueneme High School athletic teams are nicknamed the Vikings. The school is a charter member of the Citrus Coast League, a conference within the CIF Southern Section (CIF-SS) that was established in 2018. From 1998 to 2018, Hueneme competed in the Pacific View League; prior to this, the school was a long-time member of the Channel League. The school's main rival is Channel Islands High School.

The HHS girls' basketball team won its first CIF-SS championship in 2018.

Boys teams:

- Baseball
- Basketball
- Cross country
- Football
- Golf
- Soccer
- Swimming
- Tennis
- Track & field
- Volleyball
- Water polo
- Wrestling

Girls teams:

- Basketball
- Cross country
- Golf
- Soccer
- Softball
- Swimming
- Tennis
- Track & field
- Volleyball
- Water polo
- Wrestling

== Notable alumni ==
- Freddie Bradley, NFL football player; first Hueneme High School athlete drafted into the NFL in 1996 (seventh round, pick #231)
- Jason Beck, football coach
- Keary Colbert, NFL player; football player for the USC Trojans; held the USC record for most receptions before it was broken by Dwayne Jarrett in 2006.
- Charles Dillon, wide receiver for Green Bay Packers; graduated from HHS in 2004
- Howard Hilton, MLB pitcher for the St. Louis Cardinals in 1990
- Ronney Jenkins, NFL player for the San Diego Chargers; set the national record for most yards rushing in a single high school football game in 1995.
- Josh Pinkard, NFL player; free safety for the two championship USC Trojans football teams in 2004 and 2005
- Josh Towers, MLB starting pitcher for the Toronto Blue Jays in 2003
- Jerry Willard, MLB baseball player; played for parts of eight seasons.

== Notable faculty ==
- Dave Laut, U.S. Olympic shot put bronze medalist (1984) and Hueneme High School athletic director
