= Santa Paula High School =

Coordinates: 34°21′23.69″N 119°4′12.37″W

- 404 North Sixth Street; Santa Paula, California

Information
- Type: Public
- Established: 1891
- Principal: Daniel Guzman
- Faculty: Over 40
- Teaching staff: 76.35 (FTE)
- Enrollment: 1,494 (2026-2027)
- Student to teacher ratio: 21.73
- Campus: Small town; Ventura County Historical Landmark
- Colors: Red and white
- Athletics conference: CIF Southern Section; Citrus Coast League
- Mascot: Joe Cardinal
- Nickname: Cardinals
- Rival: Fillmore High School
- Website: Santa Paula High School

Santa Paula High School (SPHS) is a public comprehensive high school in Santa Paula, California, United States. It is one of two high schools in the Santa Paula Unified School District. The principal is Daniel Guzman.

== History ==
The school was founded in 1889 as the Santa Paula Academy, a private school run by the Congregational Church Association. Between 1889 and 1891, the school expanded to become Santa Paula's first school offering education beyond elementary grades. The cornerstone was laid on April 24, 1889. The Santa Paula Academy was built with money contributed by Wallace L. Hardison, C.H. McKevett, J.M. Sharp, and N.W. Blanchard. Curriculum for the school included the Latin language, Greek and Roman history, medieval and modern history, English, algebra, trigonometry, chemistry, and physics.

In 1891, the California state legislature provided for incorporation of union high school districts. The city of Santa Paula agreed with the Congregational Church Association to convert Santa Paula Academy to a public school and renamed it Santa Paula High School.

Santa Paula High School expanded rapidly throughout the early 20th century. In 1905, the land between 6th and 7th streets was bought, but later exchanged for the ground between 5th and 6th streets in 1909. That year, there were only 100 students enrolled at Santa Paula High School. In 1912, the school purchased the land where the gymnasium now stands. Enrollment had increased to 125 students, and there were six faculty members. In 1914, a three-story concrete school was built with a concrete shop in the rear for vocational training. Every classroom now had electric clocks. The original frame building was moved to Briggs School, an elementary school just outside the city of Santa Paula.

In 1924, a new study hall unit was added to the east side of the building, parallel to the auditorium unit in the center of campus. The school's football field, which opened in 1925, was dedicated by alumni of the football team as Jones Field in 1929. Also in 1929, the library was established in the study hall. By this time, the student body numbered about 250 and the faculty 20. In 1938, construction for the new campus plant began and was completed in the spring of 1939 with Spanish-style architecture. The following year, most of the current school buildings were built for $329,000 under President Franklin D. Roosevelt's New Deal.

In 1950, the school built a swimming pool and an industrial arts building. In 1957, a campus-wide remodeling project was completed, encompassing the boys' and girls' gymnasia, agriculture building, football field, cafeteria, administration offices, and health office. Enrollment at the time consisted of 1,063 students and faculty numbered 45.

The 1990s saw a series of modernization and expansion projects at the campus. In 1990, voters in the Santa Paula Union High School District passed a $5 million school bond for construction with an approval rate of approximately 85%. Modernization Project I began in 1991. Using $2.7 million of state construction funding, the girls' gym and a majority of the classrooms in the Center and Upper Courts were renovated. Also added were an elevator, new classroom furniture, computers, and other technological improvements. One 15-classroom humanities building was completed at a cost of $2.1 million in 1994. Modernization Project II began in 1994. This phase consisted of improvements in the cafeteria, converting the former board room into a food preparation area and snack bar serving lines, constructing a covered eating area outside the cafeteria, converting the staff lounge into a student store, and building a band room in the old snack bar area under the cafeteria. The total cost of the project was $700,000. In 1995, SPHS began an $8 million, five-year expansion project. Added to the campus were a new band room, cafeteria, student store, and a three-story building for 15 classrooms.

== Activities ==
Santa Paula High School offers a variety of extracurricular activities. Sponsored organizations include:

- Anime Club
- ASB
- Band
- California Scholarship Federation
- Cancer Crushers
- Dungeons and Dragons Club
- FFA (Future Farmers of America)
- Interact
- Junior Optimist Club
- Key Club
- Leo CLub
- Link Crew
- Marching Band
- M.E.Ch.A.
- Medusa Book Club
- MESA (Math, Engineering, Science Academy)
- Mock Trial
- Music Creation Club
- National Honor Society (NHS)
- Robotics Club
- S.E.S.P.E.A (Students Encouraging Social, Political, Environmental Action)
- Theater Team
- Human Services Club
- Yearbook

== Athletics ==
Santa Paula High School athletic teams are nicknamed the Cardinals, and the mascot is Joe Cardinal. The athletic director is Kelley Payne. The school is a charter member of the Citrus Coast League, a conference within the CIF Southern Section that was established in 2018. Prior to that, Santa Paula was part of the Tri-County Athletic Association.

Santa Paula's main rival is Fillmore High School. The two schools in the Santa Clara River Valley have one of the oldest continuous high school football rivalries in the state of California, having played each other since 1924 and meeting for the 100th time in 2010. The football teams play annually for a perpetual trophy known as the Leather Helmet. Games were not played in 1942 due to World War II, 1969 because of scheduling difficulties, and 2019 due to the Maria Fire. The 2020 meeting was postponed to April 2021 due to the COVID-19 pandemic, marking a resumption of the rivalry 2 1/2 years after the 2018 game. As of 2018, Santa Paula leads the series 61–40–7.

Santa Paula High School offers the following sports:

- Baseball
- Basketball
- Football
- Cheerleading
- Color guard
- Golf
- Soccer
- Softball
- Swimming
- Girls' tennis
- Track and field
- Girls' volleyball
- Girls' water polo
- Wrestling

== Notable alumni ==
- Randy Mendoza, professional soccer player
- Joseph Hernandez, professional football player for Calpoly
