= Malcolm Jones (American football) =

American football player (born 1992)

Profile
- Position: Running back

Personal information
- Born: August 2, 1992 (age 34); Naperville, Illinois, U.S.
- Listed height: 6 ft 0 in (1.83 m)
- Listed weight: 224 lb (102 kg)

Career information
- High school: Oaks Christian School (Westlake Village, California)
- College: UCLA
- NFL draft: 2014: undrafted

Malcolm Taylor Jones (born August 2, 1992) is an American former football running back. He attended the University of California, Los Angeles.

== Early life ==
Jones attended Oaks Christian High School in Westlake Village, California. As a senior, Jones rushed for 2,477 yards on 236 carries and scored 45 total touchdowns while also recording 70 tackles, three interceptions, two sacks, and two fumble recoveries on defense. He was named the Gatorade National Player of the Year and played in the U.S. Army All-American Bowl. Jones finished his high school career with 6,280 rushing yards and 113 touchdowns.

Regarded as a four-star recruit by Rivals.com, Jones was listed as the No. 9 athlete prospect in the class of 2010. Jones committed to play college football at UCLA after considering an offer from Stanford and after receiving offers from LSU, Notre Dame, and USC.

== College career ==
Jones played in 11 games for the UCLA Bruins as a true freshman and rushed for 200 yards on 55 carries. He played in 12 games in his sophomore season and rushed for 103 yards and one touchdown on 25 carries. Jones rushed three times for ten yards in UCLA's season opener against Rice as a junior after having entered the season as the fourth running back on the Bruins' depth chart. Shortly after the game, Jones announced that he would be leaving the program and seek to transfer. He initially intended to transfer to San Diego State, but ultimately decided to return to UCLA. Jones was not offered a scholarship when he returned and joined the team as a walk-on. In his final season, he rushed for 244 yards and three touchdowns while also catching three passes for 51 yards and one touchdown.

=== College statistics ===
UCLA Bruins
Season	Rushing					Receiving		
Season	Att	Yards	Avg	Yds/G	TD	Rec	Yards	TD
2010	55	200	3.6	16.7	0	2	17	0
2011	25	103	4.1	8.6	1	0	0	0
2012	3	10	3.3	10.0	0	0	0	0
2013	53	244	4.6	24.4	3	3	51	1
Career	136	557	4.1	15.9	4	5	68	1

== Personal life ==
Jones older, Marshall Jones Jr, played defensive back at USC.
