= Fillmore High School =

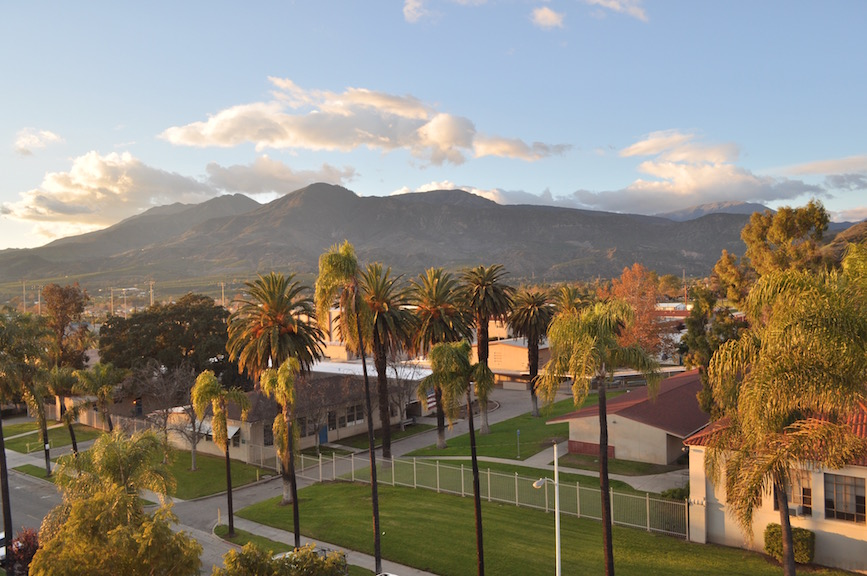
- Bird's eye view of the school

Location
- 555 Central Avenue; Fillmore, California 93015; United States; 34°24′12″N 118°54′54″W

Information
- School type: Comprehensive public high school
- Established: 1912
- School district: Fillmore Unified School District
- CEEB code: 050935
- NCES School ID: 061380001555
- Principal: John Wilbur
- Teaching staff: 47.23 (on an FTE basis)
- Grades: 9–12
- Enrollment: 992 (2023-2024)
- Student to teacher ratio: 21.00
- Colors: Royal blue and white
- Athletics conference: CIF Southern Section; Citrus Coast League
- Nickname: Flashes
- Rival: Santa Paula High School
- Yearbook: Copa de Oro
- Feeder schools: Fillmore Middle School
- Website: fillmorehighschool.fillmoreusd.org

Fillmore High School (FHS) is a public comprehensive high school serving grades 9–12 in Fillmore, California, United States that opened in 1912. It is one of two high schools in the Fillmore Unified School District, the other being Sierra High School, a continuation school.

Fillmore High School offers twelve Advanced Placement classes and twelve sports.

== Athletics ==
Fillmore High School athletic teams are nicknamed the Flashes, and the mascot is Flash Man. The school is a charter member of the Citrus Coast League, a conference within the CIF Southern Section that was established in 2018. Prior to that, Fillmore was part of the Tri-County Athletic Association.

Fillmore's main rival is Santa Paula High School. The two schools in the Santa Clara River Valley have one of the oldest continuous high school football rivalries in the state of California, having played each other since 1924 and meeting for the 100th time in 2010. The football teams play annually for a perpetual trophy known as the Leather Helmet. Games were not played in 1942 due to World War II, 1969 because of scheduling difficulties, and 2019 due to the Maria Fire. The 2020 meeting was postponed to April 2021 due to the COVID-19 pandemic, marking a resumption of the rivalry 2 1/2 years after the 2018 game. As of 2018, Santa Paula leads the series 61–40–7.

== Notable alumni ==
- François Audouy – Movie production designer
- Dorothy Leland – Chancellor of the University of California, Merced
- Hermanos Herrera – a six-sibling Mexican musical style band
- Kevin Gross – professional baseball player
