= Royal High School (California) =

Location
- 1402 East Royal Avenue; Simi Valley, California; United States
- 34.26356°N 118.77178°W

Information
- Type: Public
- Established: 1968
- School district: Simi Valley Unified School District
- CEEB code: 053379
- Principal: Reina Zapata
- Teaching staff: 83.25 (FTE)
- Grades: 9–12
- Enrollment: 1,933 (2023–2024)
- Student to teacher ratio: 23.22
- Campus: Suburban
- Colors: Green, white, and gold
- Athletics conference: CIF Southern Section; Coastal Canyon League
- Mascot: Stevie the Highlander
- Nickname: Highlanders
- Rival: Simi Valley High School
- Website: www.rhs.simivalleyusd.org

Royal High School (RHS) is a public high school in Simi Valley, California. Royal is part of the Simi Valley Unified School District and is located on Simi Valley's west side.

== History ==
Royal High School opened its doors in 1968 with sophomores and juniors, graduating its first class in 1970. At the time, the Simi Valley Unified School District educated ninth-grade students at its junior high schools.

== Academics ==
Royal High School has been named a California Distinguished School and is the recipient of a Digital High School Technology Grant. The grant provides numerous courses of study and allows the school to offer a variety of Advanced Placement classes including AP English, Statistics, Physics, Calculus AB and BC, Computer Science, Studio Art, World and U.S. History, Spanish, French, Government, Economics, Chemistry, and Biology, as well as many honors courses. RHS also offers career education via the Regional Occupational Program in the performing, visual, and technical arts. Students may take classes in piano, photography, video production, broadcasting, music (choir and band), dance, stagecraft, web design, drama, graphics design, or drawing/painting.

Royal High School has a partnership with the nearby Ronald Reagan Presidential Library and Museum. Students may earn a diploma seal by completing a community service project, taking an AP Social Science class, and being involved in school governance. Students often are involved in events at the Reagan Library, some of which involve meeting with government officials at the federal, state, and local levels. RHS has one of the few International Baccalaureate programs in Ventura County and is the only school in the area with an Air Force JROTC program.

== Athletics ==
Royal High School's athletic teams are nicknamed the Highlanders, and the school's colors are hunter green and gold. The school is a charter member of the Coastal Canyon League (CCL), a conference within the CIF Southern Section (CIF-SS) that was established in 2014. Royal competes in the CCL for all sports except football and in the Marmonte Football Association for football. Prior to 2014, the school was a member of the Marmonte League. Royal's primary rival is Simi Valley High School on the east side of the city.

== Notable alumni ==
- Mike Mo Capaldi (2007), professional skateboarder
- Zoe Hasenauer (2017), professional soccer player
- Eric King (1982), professional baseball player
- Jon Koppenhaver (2000), professional mixed martial artist
- Ken Lutz, American football player
- Matt Magill (2008), pitcher for the Los Angeles Dodgers
- Matt Mahurin (1977), illustrator, photographer and film director
- Curtis Marsh, Jr. (2006), American football player
- Scott Rice (1999), pitcher for the New York Mets
- Kenny Hensley (2006), musician
- Maiara Walsh, actress
