= Coastal Canyon League =

US high school athletic league

The Coastal Canyon League (CCL) is a high school athletic conference that is affiliated with the CIF Southern Section (CIF-SS). The league was established in 2014 during the CIF-SS Northern Area's biennial releaguing process, drawing several members from the Marmonte League as well as Camarillo and Oak Park high schools. All members are located in Ventura County.

== Member schools ==
=== Current ===
- Camarillo High School (2014–present)
- Moorpark High School (2014–present)
- Oak Park High School (2014–present)
- Royal High School (2014–present)
- Simi Valley High School (2014–present)

=== Former ===
- Agoura High School (2018–2020; joined Marmonte League)
- Calabasas High School (swimming and water polo only)

== Sports ==
The Coastal Canyon League sponsors the following sports: (Note: The Coastal Canyon League does not sponsor football; member schools compete as part of the Marmonte Football Association.)

=== Fall season ===
- Cross country
- Boys' water polo
- Girls' golf
- Girls' tennis
- Girls' volleyball

=== Winter season ===
- Basketball
- Soccer
- Wrestling
- Girls' water polo

=== Spring season ===
- Baseball
- Competitive cheerleading
- Boys' golf
- Lacrosse
- Softball
- Swimming
- Track and field
- Boys' tennis
- Boys' volleyball
