= Nordhoff High School =

Public high school in California, USA

Location
- 1401 Maricopa Hwy; Ojai, California 93023; United States

Information
- Type: Public high school
- Established: 1910
- Principal: Dave Monson
- Faculty: 62
- Teaching staff: 35.03 (FTE)
- Enrollment: 620 (2023–2024)
- Student to teacher ratio: 17.70
- Campus: Small town
- Colors: Royal blue and gold
- Athletics conference: CIF Southern Section; Citrus Coast League
- Nickname: Rangers
- Website: Nordhoff High School

Nordhoff High School (NHS), originally Nordhoff Union High School, is a public high school in Ojai, California that serves the Ojai Valley. The school, established in 1910, is part of the Ojai Unified School District.

== History ==
The original Nordhoff High School campus was located at 703 El Paseo Road, which is now the site of Matilija Middle School. The original school buildings, located in an area known as the "Arbolada", were built/rebuilt in the late 1920s using traditional Spanish Mission-style architecture. The school moved to its current location in 1966. Today, MMS still features large tiles with the initials "NUHS" on the steps of the athletic field.

The school takes its name from the town of Ojai's original name of Nordhoff. The town, in turn, was named in honor of the author Charles Nordhoff who wrote the book California for Health, Pleasure and Residence, published in June 1872. Early settlers of European ancestry were said to have been impressed with the book enough to move to and settle the area, eventually naming the town after the author. The following statement was included in an obituary written just after his death, which occurred in San Francisco on July 14, 1901:

The town of Nordhoff was named for Charles Nordhoff, in appreciation of the good words spoken of the Ojai Valley as a health resort, both as a writer and in personal talks with friends.

According to local records, the name Nordhoff fell under suspicion amid increasing anti-German sentiment in the years leading up to World War I. As part of this trend, the town was renamed Ojai in 1917, supposedly at the insistence of local businessman and philanthropist Edward Libbey. Although the community has since been renamed, the high school and the original town cemetery are the only two significant landmarks which retain the original town name of Nordhoff.

== Athletics ==
Nordhoff High School athletic teams are nicknamed the Rangers. The school is a charter member of the Citrus Coast League, a conference within the CIF Southern Section that was established in 2018. Prior to that, Nordhoff was part of the Tri-County Athletic Association.

Nordhoff's football team is considered by many to be a small-school powerhouse within the Southern California region, having made numerous appearances in CIF-SS playoff games, including three championship games since the 1990s. Nordhoff finished the 2010 school season ranked #1 in the CIF-SS Northwest Division and amassed a 12–1 overall record, including a perfect 10–0 regular season schedule. In 2012, Nordhoff won the CIF-SS Northwestern Division by defeating title game host North Torrance High School 31–14. In 2013, Nordhoff won the CIF-SS Northwestern Division by defeating El Segundo High School 49–21. That same year, Nordhoff appeared in a CIF State playoff game for the first time, losing to eventual CIF Division 3 Champion Corona del Mar High School by a score of 24–8.

The NHS softball team won its first-ever CIF-SS championship in 2019.

Nordhoff High School sponsors the following sports:

Fall season

- Football
- Marching band
- Cross country
- Boys' water polo
- Girls' golf
- Girls' tennis
- Girls' volleyball
- Cheerleading

Winter season

- Basketball
- Soccer
- Girls' water polo
- Wrestling
- Cheerleading

Spring season

- Baseball
- Softball
- Boys' golf
- Boys' tennis
- Boys' volleyball
- Swimming
- Track and field
- Girls' Lacrosse

== In popular culture ==
The movie Easy A, a 2010 teen drama/comedy, was filmed at Nordhoff High School which served as a stand-in for the fictional Ojai North High School. Many Nordhoff students and alumni were featured in the film or hired as extras.
