= Maria Fire =

2019 wildfire in Southern California

- Part of the 2019 California wildfires
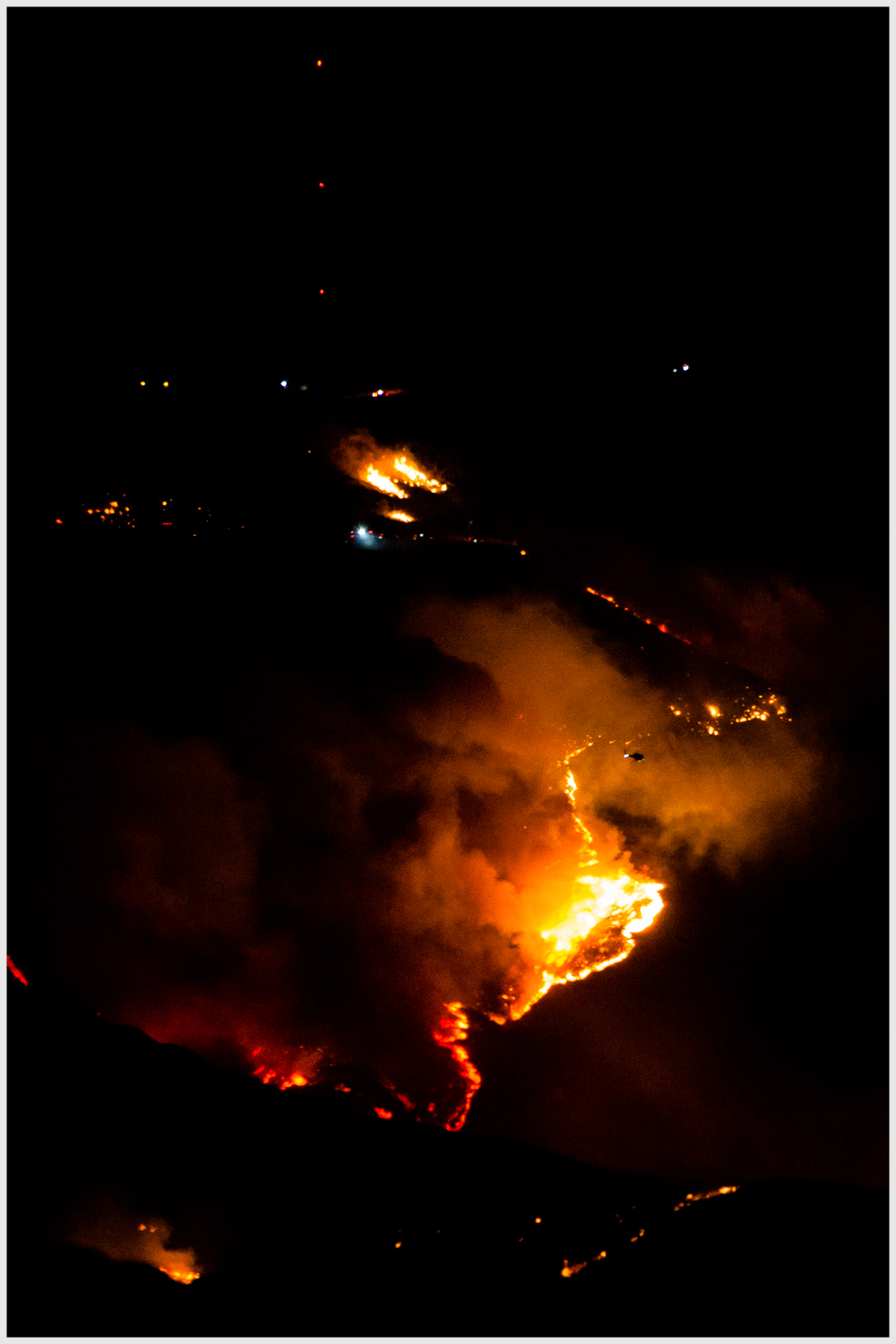
- The Maria Fire shortly before flight operations were called off due to a drone on October 31
- Date: October 31, 2019 –; November 6, 2019
- Location: Santa Paula, Ventura County, California
- Coordinates: 34.302212°N 118.997115°W

Statistics
- Burned area: 9,999 acres (4,046 ha)

Impacts
- Structures destroyed: 4 damaged

Ignition
- Cause: downed electric power line owned by California Resources Corporation during extreme wind conditions

Map
- Location in Southern California

Location of Maria Fire

The Maria Fire was a wildfire that burned the south of the community of Santa Paula in the area of Somis, California on the top of South Mountain in Ventura County. The fire ignited in the evening hours of Thursday, October 31, 2019, and consumed well over 4,000 acres (16 km^{2}) within its first several hours of burning. Despite the aggressive initial attack by first responders, the fire exploded rapidly due to a strong Santa Ana wind event that was occurring in the area during its ignition.

== Progression ==
On the eve of Thursday, October 31, at 6:13 pm, the Maria fire was reported burning at the top of South Mountain between Santa Paula and Somis and was seen making an aggressive run southwest towards the community of Somis as the fire expanded throughout that evening. Heavily influenced by 20-30 mph winds within the canyons, the fire became a full scale conflagration within its first several hours of burning, growing from 50 to 750 acres inside an hour, to over 4,000 acres (16 km^{2}) by 9:45 pm. The fire worked its way north towards Santa Paula in the Santa Clara River Valley, whose topography can serve as a wind tunnel for Santa Ana winds. Mandatory evacuations were ordered for a wide swath of over 1,800 homes surrounding the fire area, affecting over 7,500 residents.

Shortly before 11 pm, a drone had been reported flying over the fireline which immediately caused the suspension and grounding of all nighttime water-dropping helicopters that were currently fighting the fire. This hazard then allowed the incident to continue its critical rate of spread virtually unchecked. By 11:45 pm, the fire had reportedly grown to 7,400 acres with zero containment as the fire progressed predominantly westward.

During the day of November 1, three different DC-10 air tankers contracted to the US Forest Service (910, 911 and 914) and flying from Santa Maria and San Bernardino airports made multiple runs on the Maria Fire, along with helicopters including an Erickson Skycrane.

== Cause ==
Initial inquiries into the cause or origin of the Maria fire revealed that Southern California Edison (SCE), the power utility operating in the area, had re-energized 16,000-volt transmission lines in the vicinity roughly 13 minutes before first reports of the fire were received. The lines were de-energized beforehand specifically to avoid the possibility of its power lines causing fires due to the high winds in the area. SCE issued a statement indicating that it had no specific information on the cause of the fire and that it would "cooperate with the appropriate investigative agencies if asked to do so." The final report issued in October 2020 on the cause of the fire cited a combination of extreme wind conditions and a power line owned by California Resources Corporation that touched a metal pipe on the ground after an electrical conductor separated.

== Growth and containment ==
Fire containment status Gray: contained; Red: active; %: percent contained;
Date	Area burned acres (km^{2})	Containment
Oct 31	5,040 acres	
Nov 1	9,135 acres	
Nov 2	9,412 acres	
Nov 3	9,412 acres (38 km^{2})	
Nov 4	9,999 acres* (Revised acreage from better mapping) (39 km^{2})	

== See also ==
- 2019 California wildfires
- Mountain Fire (2024) - another Santa Ana driven wildfire in the same area
