= Carpinteria High School =

Coordinates: 34.4104°N 119.51674°W

Location
- 4810 Foothill Road; Carpinteria, (Santa Barbara County), California 93013; United States

Information
- Type: Public high school
- Principal: Gerardo Cornejo
- Staff: 34.57 (FTE)
- Enrollment: 609 (2023-24)
- Student to teacher ratio: 17.62
- Colors: Red and white
- Nickname: Warriors
- Website: Carpinteria High School

Carpinteria High School is a high school located in Carpinteria, California. Located adjacent to the foothills on the edge of the Carpinteria Valley, it is the only public high school in Carpinteria and serves a student body of approximately 600 students in grades 9-12.

== Activities ==
Carpinteria High School has many different clubs and societies available to students, including the California Scholastic Federation, Youth Wellness Connection club, Movimiento Estudiantil Chicano de Aztlan (MEChA), ASB Leadership, American Sign Language, Spanish Club, Environmental Club, Mock Trial, GSA, Interact Club, Eco Club, Red Cross Club, Friday Night Live, and Junior State of America, a debate team. The school also houses the Carpinteria FFA chapter, which opens opportunity for mechanics classes, livestock ownership, attendance at FFA conventions, and FFA leadership positions.

Former staff & students are served online via the ”Carpinteria High School Alumni” group on Facebook. Over 2,500 alumni (as of September 2024) discuss upcoming class reunions, in memoriam and share Carpinteria memories.

== Athletics ==
Carpinteria High School athletic teams are nicknamed the Warriors. The school is a charter member of the Citrus Coast League, a conference within the CIF Southern Section (CIF-SS) that was established in 2018. Prior to that, Carpinteria was part of the Tri-County Athletic Association.

The football program holds the CIF-SS record of 66 consecutive league wins without a loss. The program has also captured the CIF-SS championship six times. Carpinteria High School's football team defeated Moorpark High School in 52 consecutive games — a national high school record — in a streak that ended in 1997. Carpinteria 2001 graduate Chris Gocong won the Buchanan Award as the outstanding defensive player in D-l FCS football while playing for Cal Poly San Luis Obispo. Gocong was a member of the Philadelphia Eagles and the Cleveland Browns in the National Football League.

In 2018, the Carpinteria boys' soccer team won the CIF-SS championship for the second time in school history (the first was in 1999) and won the CIF State Southern California regionals in Division 6 over Rubidoux High School, which is Carpinteria's first regional champion win in program history.

The track and field program has also enjoyed notable success, winning two CIF-SS championships in Divisions 1A and IV and 36 Tri-Valley League titles in the boys division. Carpinteria's track is also home to one of California's largest track meets, the Russell Cup. The 100th Russell Cup was held on April 13, 2019. Though among the smallest high schools in Santa Barbara County, Carpinteria has produced more individual California State Champions (4) than any other county high school.

Other sports offered at Carpinteria include basketball, baseball, soccer, tennis, golf, volleyball, softball, swimming, and water polo.

== Performing arts ==
For years Carpinteria High School was and still is home to a musical theatre class, aptly named Muses, through which students are able to learn performance skills and participate in a musical show second semester, and a play the first semester. Other performing arts options include marching band in the fall, concert band in the spring, jazz band, and choir.

== Mascot controversy ==
The Carpinteria Warriors mascot is depicted as a Native American, and it has given rise to concerns that it perpetuates stereotypes against the Native American people. During the 2006–2007 school year, a Native American student raised this concern to the school board. In April 2007, the board made the decision to remove all Native American imagery from the school, but was met with public outcry. Some members of the community did not feel there was significant polling done prior to making the change. In March 2009, the school board partially overturned their decision with a 3-2 vote. The mascot remained, but some of the floormats and imagery in the school were removed.

== Notable alumni ==
- Chris Gocong, Cleveland Browns linebacker
- Noah Bryant, track and field shot putter
- Matt Alonzo, film director
- Ken Duncan, Green Bay Packers punter
