= Bishop García Diego High School =

Location
- 4000 La Colina Road; Santa Barbara, California 93110-1496; United States; 34°26′41″N 119°45′32″W

Information
- Type: Private, Coeducational
- Religious affiliation: Roman Catholic
- Established: 1959
- Authority: Archdiocese of Los Angeles
- Head of school: Karen Regan
- Faculty: 40
- Grades: 9—12
- Enrollment: 281 (2025)
- Average class size: 16
- Student to teacher ratio: 9:1
- Colors: Red and White
- Athletics conference: CIF Southern Section; Tri-County Athletic Association
- Mascot: Cardinal
- Nickname: Cardinals
- Accreditation: Western Association of Schools and Colleges; California Association of Independent Schools; Western Catholic Educators Association
- Website: Bishop García Diego High School

Bishop García Diego High School (BGDHS) is an independent private, Roman Catholic high school in Santa Barbara, California. Established in 1959, the school is named for Bishop Francisco García Diego y Moreno, the first bishop of the Diocese of the Two Californias.

== History ==
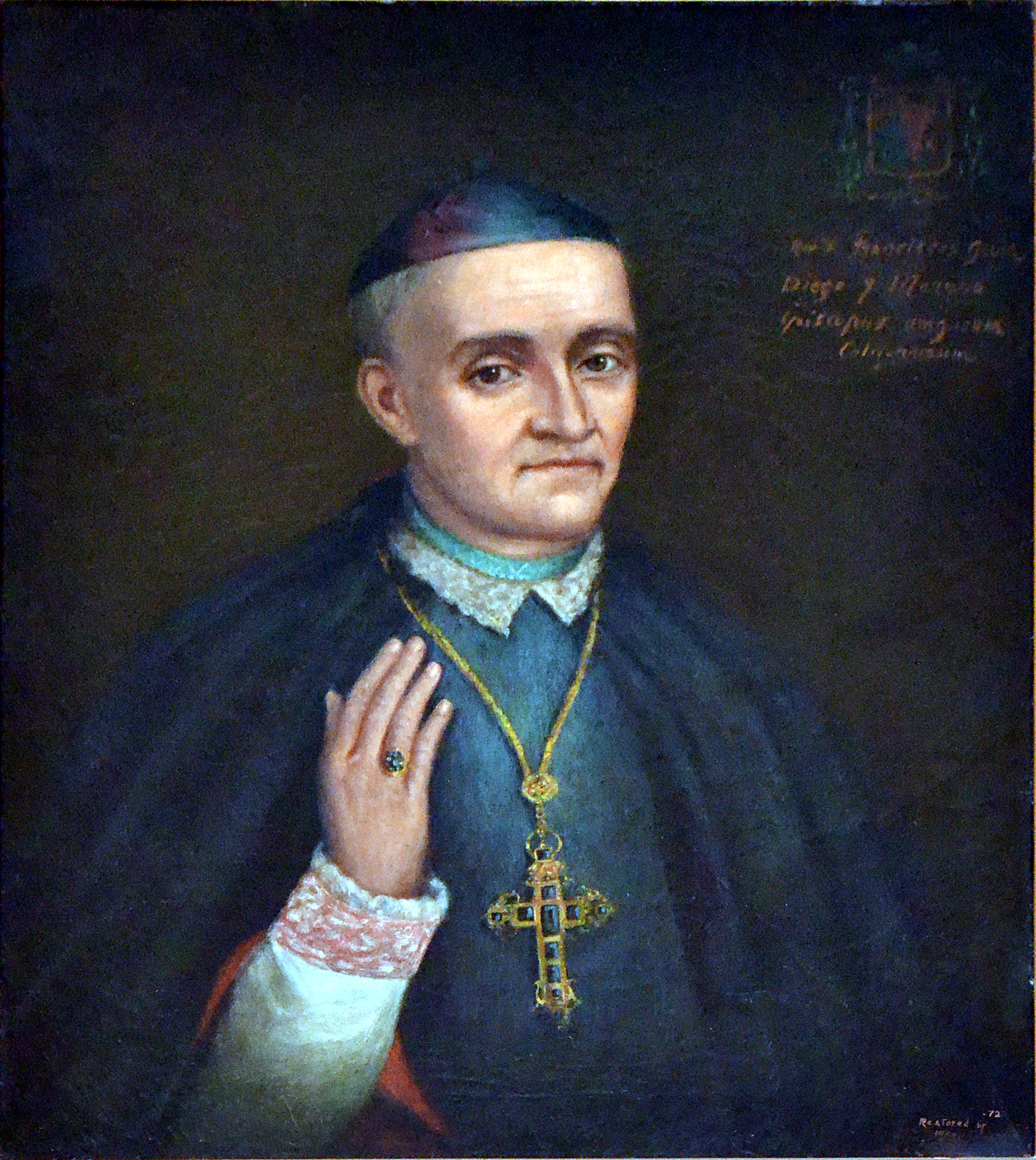
Francisco García Diego y Moreno, the first Bishop of California

Bishop García Diego High School traces its roots to Dolores School, an all-girls Catholic high school that opened in 1914 in downtown Santa Barbara. The school was renamed Notre Dame High School in the early 1920s and became co-educational as The Santa Barbara Catholic High School in 1940. In 1959, the Archdiocese of Los Angeles assumed sponsorship of the school, moving it to its present location at the base of San Marcos Pass and renaming it after California's first bishop, Bishop Francisco García Diego y Moreno.
