= Channel Islands High School =

Public high school in California, United States

Location
- 1400 Raiders Way; Oxnard, California 93033; United States

Information
- Type: Public high school
- Motto: Once a Raider, always a Raider
- Established: 1966
- School district: Oxnard Union High School District
- Superintendent: Virginia Kelsen
- Principal: Marianne Ramos
- Teaching staff: 100.47 (FTE)
- Grades: 9—12
- Enrollment: 2,444 (2023–2024)
- Student to teacher ratio: 24.33
- Campus: Urban
- Colors: Blue and gold
- Athletics conference: CIF Southern Section; Citrus Coast League
- Mascot: Raider Sam
- Nickname: Raiders
- Rival: Hueneme High School
- Newspaper: The Isle File
- Website: Channel Islands High School

Channel Islands High School (CIHS) is a secondary school located in Oxnard, California, United States. The school is part of the Oxnard Union High School District. CIHS had a student population of 2,596 during the 2018–19 school year.

== History ==
Channel Islands High School opened its doors in 1966. The campus occupies 35 acres (14 ha) of land.

== Demographics ==
As of the 2024-25 academic year, the 2,380 CIHS student population is 91% Hispanic, 6% Asian, 2% Caucasian, and 1% African American. A total of 88% of students come from economically disadvantaged backgrounds which qualify them for free or reduced-price lunches. The student:teacher ratio is 25:1. Compared to other schools, the school has a higher rate of economically disadvantaged students. However, its 95.2% graduation rate surpasses both the District and State average.

== Academics ==
Channel Islands High School offers one in-school academies:

- Marine Science Academy (Advisor: Theresa Lujan) — The Channel Islands Marine Science Academy (CIMSA) is a three-year elective program for students who are interested in marine science. The academy's partnership with Oxnard College grants CIHS students access to the college's marine science courses and facilities, including the marine center at Channel Islands Harbor. Field trips are a major component of the academy and include ROV competitions, visits to marine research facilities such as the Aquarium of the Pacific, and tide pool study. Students also create art from recycled materials, such as a dolphin sculpture made from water bottles.

== Athletics ==
Channel Islands High School athletic teams are nicknamed the Raiders, and the mascot is Raider Sam. The school is a charter member of the Citrus Coast League, a conference within the CIF Southern Section (CIF-SS) that was established in 1998. The school's main rival is nearby Hueneme High School.

The first CIHS team to earn a CIF-SS championship was the boys' cross country team in 1967, in only the school's second year in existence. This was followed by the baseball team's 1969 section title.

The Raiders boys' basketball team won back-to-back CIF-SS titles in 1977 and 1978.

The Channel Islands boys' soccer team won a CIF-SS championship in 2020, the school's first section title in any team sport since the 1978 boys' basketball team championship.

=== Boys' teams ===
- Baseball
- Basketball
- Cross Country
- Football
- Golf
- Soccer
- Swimming
- Tennis
- Track & field
- Volleyball
- Water polo
- Wrestling

=== Girls' teams ===
- Basketball
- Cross Country
- Flag Football
- Golf
- Soccer
- Softball
- Swimming
- Tennis
- Track and field
- Volleyball
- Water polo
- Wrestling

=== Dance squads ===
Channel Islands High School has gained national recognition for its various dance squads. The school's short flags squad is the first to "three-peat" four times at the United Spirit Association (USA) Nationals — three times in 2-Flag (1986, 1987, 1988; 2001, 2002, 2003; 2009, 2010, 2011), as well as once in 1-Flag (2011, 2012, 2013). CIHS is also the most decorated pep flags team in the history of Miss Dance Drill Team USA (MDDTUSA), having won seven world championships (1985, 1987, 2001, 2003, 2010, 2012, 2013) and 35 national titles in two- and one-flag divisions (1985–2018). The team has also implemented changing their flags in a "flag-change", much like what is seen in a colorguard or winterguard routine.

The school's drill teams have also earned championships for the school. The co-ed dance team won MDDTUSA titles in 2013, 2014, and 2018 (large division). Hip hop dance teams won championships in 2014 (female, medium division) and 2018 (male, small). Small military won a title in 2014.

== Notable alumni ==
- Jacob Cruz, former Major League Baseball outfielder, San Francisco Giants and Cincinnati Reds
- Maria Echaveste, former U.S. presidential advisor to Bill Clinton; White House Deputy Chief of Staff under the second Clinton administration
- Robert Garcia, former world champion boxer; current boxing trainer
- Terry Pendleton, former MLB third baseman and coach, and 1991 National League MVP, Atlanta Braves
- Blaine Saipaia, National Football League offensive lineman, St. Louis Rams
- Dolores Tuimoloau, track and field athlete who competed for American Samoa in the 1995 Pacific Ocean Games
- Jeremiah Valoaga, NFL defensive end, Las Vegas Raiders
- Fernando Vargas, former world champion boxer

== Notable faculty ==
- Football (Coach: Jeremiah Valoaga)
