= Del Sol High School (California) =

Public high school in California, United States

Location
- 1975 Camino Del Sol; Oxnard, (Ventura County), California 93030; United States

Information
- Type: Public high school
- Principal: Terri León
- Staff: 41.12 (FTE)
- Enrollment: 808 (2024-2025)
- Student to teacher ratio: 19.65
- Colors: Black, orange, and yellow
- Nickname: Jaguars
- Website: Del Sol High School

Del Sol High School is a public high school located in the East Village neighborhood of Oxnard, California. The school is part of the Oxnard Union High School District and opened in 2023.

== History ==
In 2004, voters in the Oxnard Union High School District (OUHSD) approved Measure H, a school bond proposal to finance construction of three new high school campuses — two in Oxnard — and improvements to existing campuses. One of the sites in Oxnard identified for a new campus was a 53-acre (21 ha) agricultural parcel at the corner of Camino Del Sol and Rose Avenue in the East Village neighborhood. On November 13, 2019, OUHSD's board of trustees voted to purchase the site for $26.9 million and to name the new school Del Sol High School. The school opened to freshmen in 2023 and will add a grade level each year.
