= Grace Brethren High School =

Public high school in California, United States

Grace Jr/Sr High School

Location
- 1350 Cherry Avenue; Simi Valley, California; United States; 34°15′49″N 118°45′2″W

Information
- Type: Private, Coeducational
- Motto: A Distinctly Christian Education
- Religious affiliation: Nondenominational Christianity
- Established: 1989 (first high school students enrolled)
- Grades: 7—12
- Colors: Red and black
- Athletics conference: CIF Southern Section; Tri-County Athletic Association
- Nickname: Lancers
- Accreditation: ACSI
- Website: www.graceschoolsimi.com

Grace Jr./Sr. High School (Grace) is a co-educational, college-preparatory Christian school in Simi Valley, California serving grades 7–12. The school is one of three campuses in Simi Valley comprising Grace School, the others being an elementary school (grades K—6) and a preschool.

== History ==
Grace Brethren enrolled its first ninth-grade students in 1989. Those first ten students comprised the school's first graduating class in 1993. Grace High School started as a Preschool and was started by five men from the church of the same name.

== Academics ==
Grace Brethren High School is home to the Space Brethren Cubesat Laboratory. Opened in 2018, this 200-square-foot facility allows students to design, build, and maintain a CubeSat miniature satellite as part of the school's STEM curriculum. The lab is operated in cooperation with General Dynamics Mission Systems and local businesses. Launch of the satellite is scheduled for 2020.

== Athletics ==
Grace High School athletic teams are nicknamed the Lancers. The school is a member of the CIF Southern Section (CIF-SS) and competes in the Tri-County Athletic Association for all sports except football. From 2014 to 2019, the Lancers were members of the Marmonte Football Association for football.

The Grace football team won back-to-back CIF-SS championships in 2017 and 2018 as well as the CIF State Division 2-AA championship in 2018. The Lancers also appeared in the CIF State Division 2-A title game in 2017. Grace does not have an on-campus football stadium; the Lancers play home football games at Moorpark College.

Grace's 2020 football season was postponed to spring 2021, shortened, and ultimately canceled due to the COVID-19 pandemic. In March 2021, head coach Josh Henderson announced his retirement, prompting few players to return for the abbreviated season. The school also suspended its youth football program for at least a year. In April, Grace announced it was leaving the Marmonte Football Association.

== Notable alumni ==
- Jay Toia, NFL defensive tackle for the Dallas Cowboys
- Cai Xukun (Kun), Chinese singer-songwriter and actor
