= Oaks Christian School =

Location
- 31749 La Tienda Road; Westlake Village, California; United States; 34.153°N 118.810°W

Information
- Type: Private, Coeducational
- Motto: "Preparing Minds for Leadership and Hearts for Service"
- Religious affiliation: Nondenominational Christianity
- Established: 2000
- Founder: David Price and Dallas Price-Van Breda
- Head of school: Rob Black
- Grades: 4–12
- Enrollment: 1,662 (1,072 grades 9–12, 590 grades 4–8) (2023–24)
- Colors: Cardinal and Gold
- Athletics conference: CIF Southern Section; Marmonte League
- Team name: Lions
- Accreditation: Western Association of Schools and Colleges, Southern Association of Colleges and Schools, National Association of Independent Schools
- Yearbook: The Pride
- Website: www.oakschristian.org

Oaks Christian School (OCS) is a co-educational, college-preparatory, non-denominational Christian school serving students TK–12. Oaks Christian School is located on 25 acres (10 ha) in Westlake Village, Los Angeles County, California. The school was established in 2000. As of the 2025–26 school year, total student enrollment was approximately 1,725 students. Approximately 65% of these students are enrolled in high school (grades 9–12), while the remainder comprise the middle school population (grades 4–8).

== History ==
In 1997, eighteen acres (7.3 ha) in a Westlake Village industrial park were purchased for the original campus. Oaks Christian School opened in 2000 to approximately 160 high school students and 40 middle school students. By the year 2002, most of the school and campus infrastructure had been completed, with the exception of the Bedrosian Pavilion, a performing arts facility completed in 2007. Surrounded by the Four Seasons Hotel to the east, the Ventura Freeway to the south, and a large industrial park to the north, only one property lies contiguous to the campus. That seven-acre property became available in 2007, allowing for expansion.

In the 2009–10 school year, Oaks Christian opened its new middle school facility on the adjacent property. In 2014-15, the Academy V program for fifth grade students was launched.

As of the 2019–20 school year, Oaks Christian opened a new on-site student dormitory that offers both 5- and 7-day/week boarding options. Additionally, the 14,000 square foot Idea Lab (Innovation/Design/Engineering/Aeronautics) offers students a jump start into careers focused on STEM career paths. Admission is competitive (59% acceptance rate), based on a variety of criteria ranging from primary school grades, Independent School Entrance Examination (ISEE) score, a personal interview, essays, and extracurricular interests. Oaks Christian School added grades TK-3 in fall 2026, making Oaks Christian a full-service TK-12 college-preparatory school.

== Academics ==
Oaks Christian School is accredited by the Western Association of Schools and Colleges, the National Association of Independent Schools, as well as the Southern Association of Colleges and Schools.

The school has five signature institutes providing students with dedicated pathways for their interests: Global Leadership, Arts and Innovation, Engineering, Bible and Discipleship, and Health Science.

== Athletics ==
Oaks Christian School teams are nicknamed the Lions. The school is a member of the CIF Southern Section (CIF-SS) and competes in the Marmonte League. OCS sponsors 48 athletic teams across 26 sports. As of the 2019–20 school year, OCS holds a total of 57 CIF-SS championships (including six consecutive section titles in football in the 2000s), seven CIF-State titles, three Gatorade State Players of the Year, and one Gatorade National Player of the Year.

State Championship
Sport			Year
Football	Division III	Oaks Christian def. Cardinal Newman (Santa Rosa) 27-20 OT	2006
boys' and girls' track and field			seven CIF-SS championships between 2014 to now.
girls' water polo			2019

== Notable alumni ==
- Alex Bachman (born 1996), professional football player
- Nate Bennett (born 2005), college football player for the Baylor Bears
- Phil Bickford, Major League Baseball player
- Annie Bosko, American country music singer-songwriter
- Maya Brady, college softball player
- Zach Charbonnet (born 2001), professional football player
- Jimmy Clausen, professional football player
- Colin Ford (born 1996), actor (OC Online)
- Alani Fua, professional football player
- Max Heidegger (born 1997), American-Israeli professional basketball player in the Israeli Basketball Premier League
- Dree Hemingway (born 1987), model and actress
- Malcolm Jones, UCLA football player
- Cameron Judge, Canadian Football League player
- Cassius Marsh, professional football player
- Casey Matthews, professional football player
- Nick Montana, college football player
- Kiara Nowlin, college gymnast
- Chris Owusu, professional football player
- Francis Owusu, professional football player
- Colby Parkinson (born 1999), professional football player
- Jordan Payton, professional football player
- Michael Pittman Jr. (born 1997), professional football player
- Sofia Richie (born 1998), model and fashion designer
- Carson Schwesinger (born 2003), professional football player
- Morgan Stickney (born 1997), Paralympic swimming gold medalist (OC Online)
- Preston Strother (born 1999), actor
- Kayvon Thibodeaux (born 2000), professional football player
- Marc Tyler, Southern California football player
- Peter Weber (born 1991), television personality
- Quentin Young, minor league baseball player
