= Realignment in sports =

In North American sports, realignment or releaguing refers to a major change in the competitive structure of one or more existing leagues. The mechanics differ somewhat between amateur and professional sports.

== Professional sports ==
In professional sports, this occurs when a league decides to change which teams are in which divisions, usually by creating new divisions. In all of the four major North American sports leagues, all of the teams are grouped into one of two conferences (or leagues in baseball) while each conference/league is further subdivided into divisions. Teams in the same division play each other more regularly than teams in the same conference, and much more often than teams in the other conference. Teams from the same division can form intense rivalries. The top team from a division is always guaranteed a playoff spot and guaranteed a higher seeding in the playoffs. Divisions are usually based on geography, both to minimise travel costs and to encourage regional rivalries.

Divisions are not always static. Sometimes a team may relocate to a new city, and as a result the division may become geographically skewed. For instance, when the Atlanta Thrashers of the NHL became the Winnipeg Jets in 2011, they would have been a team from a northwestern city playing in the Southeast Division, but the NHL chose not to realign at this time, leading to lengthy road trips for the Jets and the other teams in their division. The Jets moved to the Central Division in the Western Conference for the 2013–14 NHL season.

Also, divisions need to be roughly equal in size to ensure that each team has an equal chance of becoming division champion. When a league introduces new teams in new markets, placing them in the division best suited to their geography may result in more teams in that division, so realignment is necessary. The 1969 baseball realignment coincided with the addition of four teams, whereas its 1994 realignment creating extra divisions in both the American League and the National League came a year after the league added the Colorado Rockies and Florida Marlins. The National Football League realigned to its current eight-division format after a series of team relocations had created geographically skewed divisions.

Sometimes a sport will favor old division rivalries over geographical consistency. The rivalries the Dallas Cowboys of the NFL maintain with the teams of the eastern seaboard, especially the Washington Commanders, meant they were kept in an eastern division after realignment, even though they are geographically dissimilar to their division rivals.

== College sports ==
In college sports, the term "realignment" is used to refer to a situation in which large numbers of schools switch their conference affiliation in a short period of time. Especially in the top level of college sports, NCAA Division I, several schools change their affiliations in one or more sports every year. However, the term is usually reserved for situations which affect large numbers of conferences—most notably in 1996, 2005, 2010–2014, and most recently the 2020s.

Each of the four realignment periods below was driven mainly by one or a few conferences:

- 1996: Formation of the Big 12 and CUSA, expansion of the WAC (which split up only three years later)
- 2005: Expansion of the ACC
- 2010: Expansion of the Big Ten, Pac-12, and SEC, plus further expansion of the ACC, leading to a concurrent reduction in the number of Big 12 members and the split of the Big East Conference
  - A separate but related phase that involved only men's ice hockey was triggered by Penn State adding the sport, enabling the Big Ten to start a men's ice hockey league. This led to the demise of the original CCHA, the creation of the NCHC, and major membership turnover in the WCHA.
- 2021:
  - First phase: Further expansion of the SEC, leading to sweeping changes in the Big 12 membership that cascaded through most D-I conferences
    - In ice hockey, the revival of the CCHA by seven schools that left the men's side of the WCHA, leading to the WCHA becoming a women-only league
  - Second phase: Started with the announced move of the two most prominent Pac-12 programs to the Big Ten, and later followed by eight more Pac-12 members announcing their departure for other conferences, resulting in that league's effective demise
