= List of University of California, Merced faculty =

This article lists notable faculty (past and present) of the University of California, Merced.

== Anthropology ==
- Mark Aldenderfer

== Art ==
- Dunya Ramicova

== Biological sciences ==
- Chris Amemiya
- Jennifer Pett-Ridge

== Chemistry ==
- Henry Jay Forman

== Civil & environmental engineering ==
- Mark Matsumoto
- Nigel Quinn

== Cognitive science ==
- Teenie Matlock

== Computer science ==
- Ming-Hsuan Yang

== Ecology ==
- Jessica L. Blois

== Economics ==
- Catalina Amuedo-Dorantes
- Robert Innes

== Electrical engineering ==
- Sarah Kurtz

== Environmental science ==
- Asmeret Asefaw Berhe - former director, Office of Science, Department of Energy
- Marilyn Fogel
- Teamrat Ghezzehei

== History ==
- Gregg Herken
- Nathan Monroe
- David Ruoff

== Literature and languages ==
- Arturo Arias
- Humberto Garcia
- Manuel Martín-Rodríguez

== Mathematics ==
- Juan C. Meza
- Chrysoula Tsogka

== Mechanical engineering ==
- Michelle Khine
- Ashlie Martini
- Ala Qattawi

== Physics ==
- Raymond Chiao
- Linda S. Hirst
- Gillian Wilson
- Roland Winston

== Psychological science ==
- Sarah Depaoli
- Martin Hagger
- William Shadish

== Sociology ==
- Tanya Golash-Boza - executive director of the University of California Washington Center
- Marjorie Zatz

== See also ==
- List of University of California, Merced alumni
