= Fictive =

Fictive may refer to:

- Fictive kinship
- Fictive marriage, a term for Marriage of convenience
- Fictive motion, a relatively new subject in psycholinguistics and cognitive linguistics
- Fictive architecture, a term for Trompe-l'œil
- Fictive behavior
