= Zatz =

Zatz is a surname. Notable people with the surname include:

- Luisa Mell (born 1978, actual name Marina Zatz de Camargo), Brazilian presenter and animal activist
- Marjorie Zatz (born 1955), American sociologist
- Mayana Zatz (born 1947), Israeli-born Brazilian molecular biologist and geneticist
