= UC Merced School of Engineering =

University of California, Merced, School of Engineering
- Type: Public engineering school
- Established: 2005; 21 years ago
- Parent institution: University of California, Merced
- Dean: Rakesh Goel
- Academic staff: 83 (2025)
- Undergraduates: 3,018 (2025)
- Postgraduates: 257 (2025)
- Location: Merced, California, United States; 37°21′52.9″N 120°25′27.1″W
- Website: engineering.ucmerced.edu

The UC Merced School of Engineering (SoE) is one of the university's three founding schools, at the University of California, Merced. Established in 2005, it offers undergraduate and graduate programs in a wide variety of engineering fields. It currently occipies three major buildings on campus which support the instructional and research needs of the school. There are currently three ABET-accredited undergraduate engineering majors offered.

== History ==
The School of Engineering was founded concurrently with the opening of the University of California, Merced in 2005, along with two other founding schools. From its inception, the school was designed to serve as a hub for research and education addressing the demands for undergraduate and graduate education for the university.

Early academic programs included Mechanical Engineering, Environmental Engineering, and Computer Science & Engineering, which have since expanded to encompass a diverse range of disciplines. Over the years, the school has developed research strengths in Biotechnology, Materials science, and sustainable infrastructure.

In 2020, the completion of the UC Merced 2020 Project added new laboratory facilities, instructional spaces, and research centers, helping to expand the physical footprint of the engineering school. The Sustainability, Research and Engineering (SRE) building was one of the newest additions to the school.

== Academic departments and programs ==
The School of Engineering houses both undergraduate and graduate programs organized under departments which offer different programs under them. As of 2026, the school offers the following departments and majors offered:

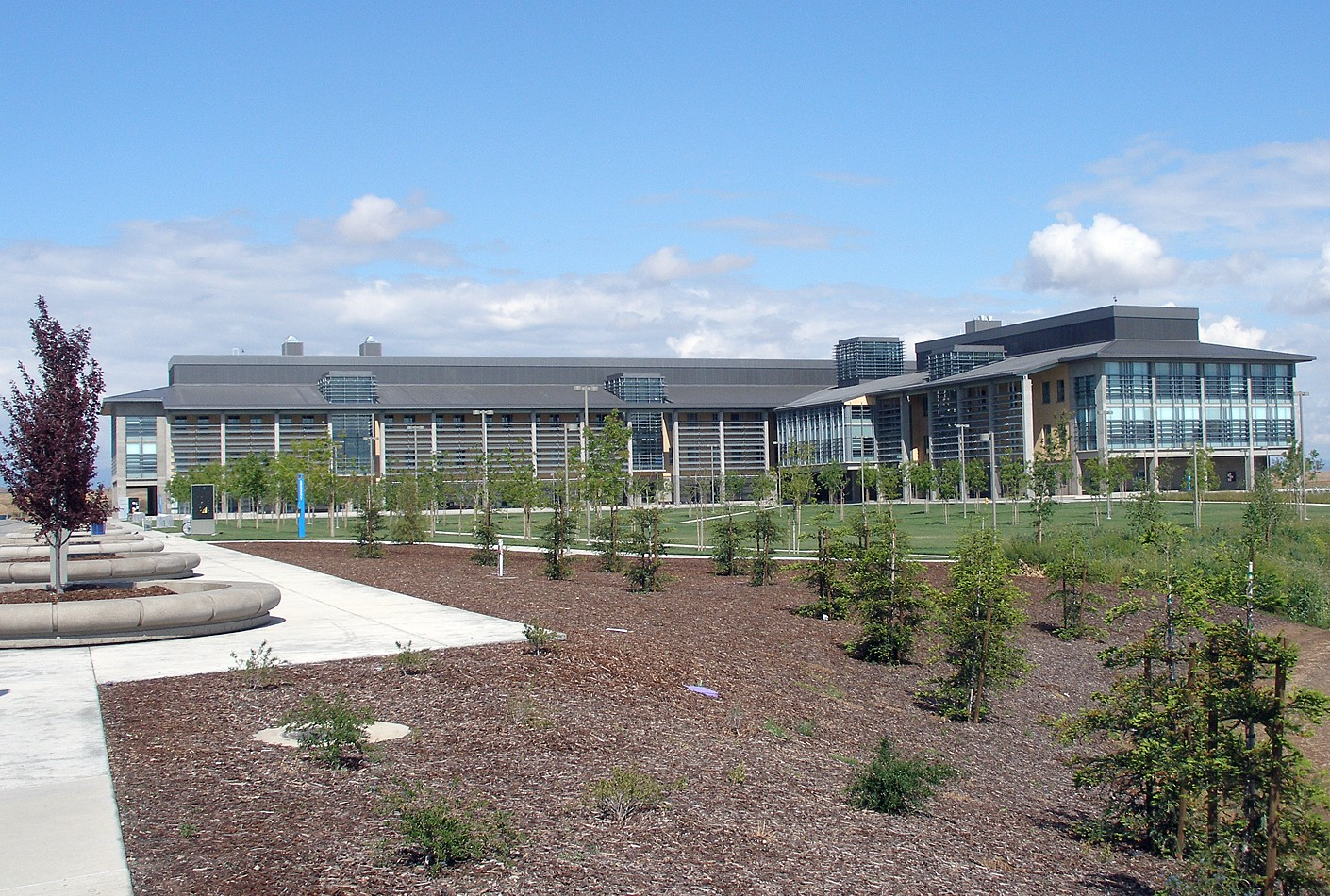
Science and Engineering Building 1, the first building of the School

- Aerospace engineering (AE)
- Biochemical and Biomolecular Engineering (BBE)
- Bioengineering (BioE)
- Chemical engineering (ChemE)
- Civil and Environmental engineering (CEE)
- Computer science and engineering (CSE)
- Data science and Analytics (DSA)
- Electrical engineering (EE)
- Materials Science and Engineering (MSE)
- Mechanical engineering (ME)
- Management of Innovation, Sustainability and Technology (MIST)

Graduate research groups further integrate these areas with campus-wide programs in:

- Bioengineering
- Electrical engineering and Computer Science (EECS)
- Environmental systems
- Materials and Biomaterials Science and Engineering
- Mechanical engineering
- Management of Complex Systems

== Research and facilities ==
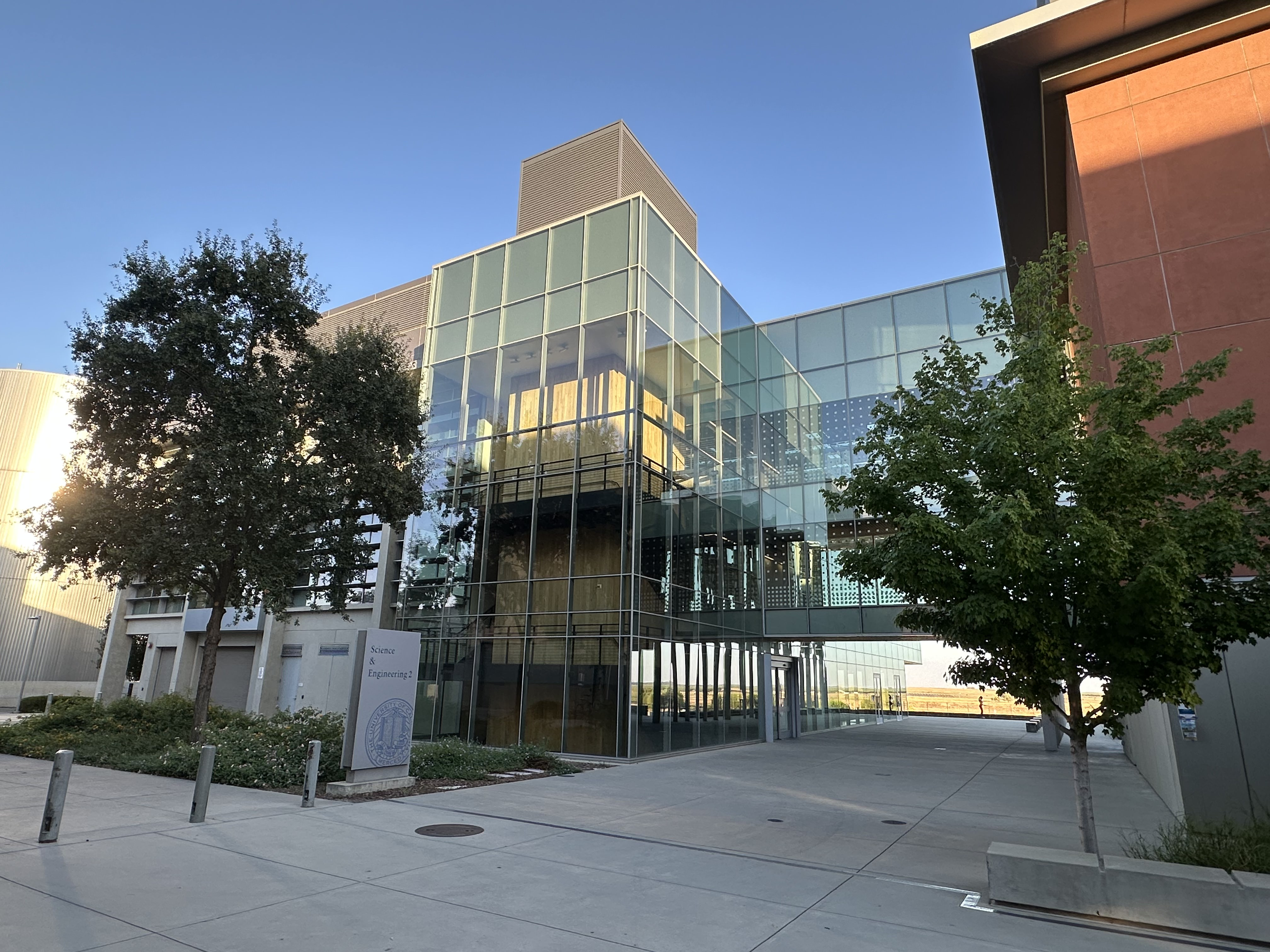
Science and Engineering 2 Building

Research within the School of Engineering spans a wide array of interdisciplinary topics such as:

- Precision agriculture and agricultural robotics for sustainable and data driven food systems
- Organic electronics and wearable devices for health and environmental monitoring
- Biomedical imaging, immune cell engineering, and diagnostics for disease detection and treatment
- Renewable energy innovation and solar energy materials research for both terrestrial and aerospace applications
- Environmental modeling and climate change adaptation focused on water systems, land use, and regional sustainability
- Human–computer interaction and assistive technology development to improve accessibility in computing environments
- Complex systems modeling, sustainable entrepreneurship, and systems engineering approaches for organizational and societal resilience

The school is home to several notable laboratories and centers, including the UC Merced Energy Research Institute (UCMERI), the Sierra Nevada Research Institute (SNRI), and the Center for Information Technology Research in the Interest of Society (CITRIS) and the Banatao Institute, which connects UC Merced researchers to collaborations across other UC campuses.

== Student organizations and activities ==
There are several professional and academic organizations related to engineering on campus, including:

- American Society of Mechanical Engineers (ASME)
- Institute of Electrical and Electronics Engineers (IEEE)
- Society of Women Engineers (SWE)
- National Society of Black Engineers (NSBE)
- Society of Hispanic Professional Engineers (SHPE)
- Association for Computing Machinery (ACM)
- Engineering Service Learning and Capstone Design teams

The school also hosts the Innovate To Grow event every semester, where graduating students present their senior design projects to industry partners and the campus community.

== Leadership ==
The School of Engineering is led by a dean appointed by the Chancellor of UC Merced. Past deans have included:

- Jeffrey Wright, Founding Dean (2005–2009)
- Daniel Hirleman, Dean (2009–2015)
- Mark Matsumoto, Dean (2015–2022)
- Erik Roland Westerwick (Interim, 2022)
- Rakesh Goel (2022–present)

== See also ==
- List of engineering schools
- University of California, Merced
- List of University of California, Merced faculty
