= Justin De Fratus =

American baseball player (born 1987)

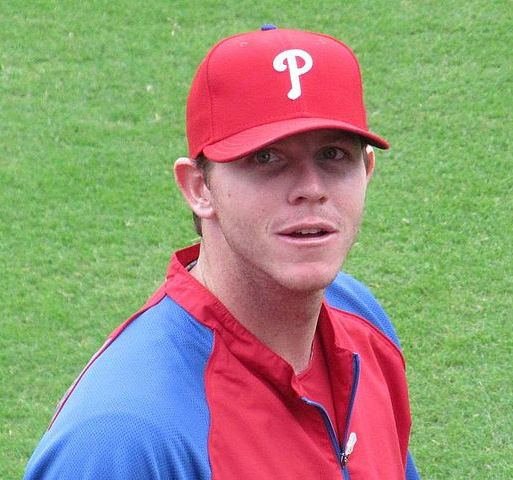
- Justin De Fratus during batting practice in Philadelphia on September 27, 2012
- Relief pitcher
- Born: October 21, 1987 (age 38); Oxnard, California, U.S.
- Batted: Switch Threw: Right

MLB debut
- September 18, 2011, for the Philadelphia Phillies

Last MLB appearance
- October 3, 2015, for the Philadelphia Phillies

MLB statistics
- Win–loss record: 7–6
- Earned run average: 4.08
- Strikeouts: 170
- Stats at Baseball Reference

Teams
- Philadelphia Phillies (2011–2015)

Justin Andrew De Fratus (born October 21, 1987), is an American former professional baseball relief pitcher. He played in Major League Baseball (MLB) for the Philadelphia Phillies from 2011 to 2015.

De Fratus grew up in Oxnard, California and played baseball in high school prior to playing at Ventura College. The Philadelphia Phillies selected him in the 11th round of the 2007 Major League Baseball draft. De Fratus methodically moved his way up through the Phillies farm system, spending about one year at each level, from rookie to Single–A, and then moving through two levels per season in 2010 and 2011. In 2011, De Fratus made his MLB debut and, by 2013, he was a regular member of the Phillies bullpen after a few years of splitting time between the big leagues and Triple-A. In 2014, De Fratus used his slider to "dominate the league", and establish himself as a reliable reliever, capable of pitching in late-inning situations.

De Fratus has a two-pitch repertoire that consists of a fastball and a slider, the latter of which is his out pitch. He embraces a propensity to work quickly on the mound, and use a lower arm slot. Off the field, De Fratus is a member of the Roman Catholic church, and uses baseball to strengthen his faith. He sees evangelism as a duty of Christians, and would like to go to seminary when he finishes his baseball career.

== Early life ==
Before High School, De Fratus attended Mesa Union School District. He then attended Rio Mesa High School in Oxnard, California, from which he graduated in 2005; he was a fan of the Los Angeles Dodgers. His high school coach, David Soliz, asserted that he could pitch in the major leagues for a long time, saying, "He definitely has the stuff to pitch in the majors. Justin has the stuff, but he also has the confidence. The odds were against him being drafted in the 11th round out of Ventura College." De Fratus was the first Mesa Union, and Rio Mesa player to reach the majors during Soliz's tenure. He went on to attend Ventura College where, like at Rio Mesa, he was a starting pitcher.

== Professional career ==
=== Philadelphia Phillies ===
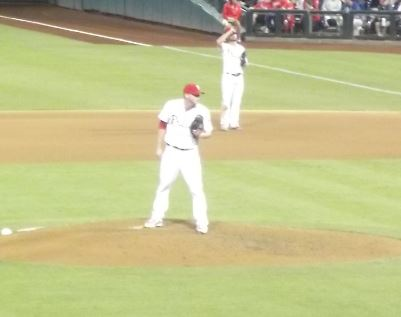
On September 7, 2013, De Fratus peers at the catcher for a sign in a Phillies game

The Phillies selected De Fratus with the 353rd overall pick in the 11th round of the 2007 Major League Baseball draft, and assigned him to the Gulf Coast League Phillies, the Phillies' rookie level minor league affiliate, with whom he went 2–3 with a 4.30 earned run average (ERA) in 10 games (eight starts). The next season, 2008, he advanced to the Williamsport Crosscutters, and went 6–5 with a 3.67 ERA in 14 starts. He led the New York–Penn League in innings pitched, pitching at least six in almost 65% of his starts; the Phillies named him their minor league player of the week in mid-June. Before the 2009 season, at the decision of Phillies minor league pitching coordinator Gorman Heimueller and assistant general manager Chuck LaMar, De Fratus became predominantly a relief pitcher so he was "not sitting down four games out of the week" and could be a more focused pitcher. He took his first crack at relief pitching with the Lakewood BlueClaws, and ultimately began to flourish, earning Phillies minor league player of the week honors, and a spot in the South Atlantic League all-star game. On the season, he posted a 5–6 record with a 3.19 ERA in 36 games (though still with 12 starts). After the season, he participated in the Florida Instructional League. He had a successful 2010 season, splitting time between the High-A Clearwater Threshers and Double-A Reading Phillies, and posting a 1.94 ERA with 21 saves in 49 games.

De Fratus began the 2011 season with Double-A Reading, and was promoted to the Triple-A Lehigh Valley IronPigs on June 16 after much success in Reading. He recorded seven saves with Lehigh Valley, and was named the Phillies minor league player of the week in late August, before making his MLB debut with the Philadelphia Phillies on September 18, 2011, after joining the team as a September callup. During his debut, an opposing batter fouled a ball off, and De Fratus's brother caught the ball. Ultimately, it was a scoreless debut, and he went on to pitch four more big-league games that season. At the end of the season, Baseball America rated him the seventh-best prospect in the Phillies' minor league system. Before 2012, like in 2011, he was given an opportunity to open the season in the Phillies bullpen, but ended up injuring his shoulder, and missing much of the season. He called the injury a "beat down" both physically and mentally, but he returned and pitched with the big-league club in September. At the conclusion of the season, he was mentally exhausted and used golf to help "divert" his attention from baseball, playing over 50 rounds in the offseason; he credited golf with helping him overcome the mental exhaustion he faced after the season, and entered 2013 in a relaxed frame of mind.

By 2013, De Fratus was a regular member of the bullpen, pitching in 58 games with the big-league club; he performed well enough to be considered likely to open the 2014 season firmly implanted in the Phillies bullpen. He broke spring training 2014 with the major league team, but after four appearances, he was optioned back to the minor leagues to work on commanding his pitches, notwithstanding the Phillies' dearth of other right-handed relieving options. While at Lehigh Valley, he spent a significant amount of time reviewing film from his outings in 2011 and 2012, from which he learned that he had a faster pace when pitching, a more aggressive pitching style, and a lower arm slot. Just under a month later, in late May, he was recalled to the major league team, and had much success (11 consecutive scoreless appearances) as part of a Phillies' bullpen that drastically improved from the beginning of the season, and, statistically, was among the best in the major leagues in early June. De Fratus' drastically improved command helped him halve his career walk rate – he walked just 5.5% of batters he faced in 2014, which contributed to a "breakout" season. Although he was overshadowed by the emergence of fellow relief pitcher Ken Giles, De Fratus established himself as a reliable late-innings reliever for the future.

De Fratus made 61 appearances for Philadelphia during the 2015 campaign, but struggled to a 5.51 ERA with 68 strikeouts across 80 innings of work. On October 7, 2015, De Fratus was removed from the 40–man roster and sent outright to Triple–A Lehigh Valley.

=== Seattle Mariners ===
On December 2, 2016, De Fratus signed a one–year, major league contract with the Seattle Mariners. He was released on March 16, 2016, and re-signed to a minor league contract the following day.

=== Texas Rangers ===
On June 11, 2016, De Fratus was traded to the Texas Rangers as the player to be named later in a previous trade that saw Patrick Kivlehan be acquired by the Mariners. In 10 appearances for the Triple–A Round Rock Express, he compiled a 1.93 ERA with 7 strikeouts across 9 1/3 innings pitched. De Fratus was released by the Rangers organization on July 14.

=== Washington Nationals ===
On July 22, 2016, De Fratus signed a minor league contract with the Washington Nationals organization. In 7 games for the Double–A Harrisburg Senators, he posted a 1.69 ERA with 8 strikeouts. However, in 9 outings for the Triple–A Syracuse Chiefs, he struggled to a 9.00 ERA with 10 strikeouts. De Fratus elected free agency following the season on November 7.

=== Southern Maryland BlueCrabs ===
On February 28, 2017, De Fratus signed a minor league contract with the San Diego Padres organization. He was released a month later.

On April 6, 2017, De Fratus signed with the Southern Maryland Blue Crabs of the Atlantic League of Professional Baseball. In 4 starts for the Blue Crabs, he logged a 3–1 record and 1.40 ERA with 22 strikeouts across 25 2/3 innings pitched.

=== Seattle Mariners (second stint) ===
On May 9, 2017, De Fratus signed a minor league contract with the Seattle Mariners. In 17 appearances (16 starts) for the Double–A Arkansas Travelers, he registered a 5–7 record and 4.85 ERA with 53 strikeouts across 98 1/3 innings pitched. De Fratus elected free agency following the season on November 6.

=== Los Angeles Dodgers ===
On February 17, 2018, De Fratus signed a minor league contract with the Los Angeles Dodgers. He was named to the mid-season Texas League All-Star Game as a member of the Tulsa Drillers. Overall he made 11 starts for Tulsa and 12 for the Triple–A Oklahoma City Dodgers, with a 7–9 record and 4.74 ERA. He became a free agent following the season on November 2.

De Fratus re-signed with the Dodgers on a minor-league deal on January 26, 2019. He again split the season between Tulsa and Oklahoma City, pitching in 25 games (22 starts) and posting a 5.60 ERA and 9–13 record with 98 strikeouts over 141 1/3 innings. De Fratus elected free agency following the season on November 4.

== Coaching career ==
After the 2019 season, De Fratus chose to retire from playing to become a minor league coach in the Dodgers system.

On February 23, 2024, De Fratus was announced as a pitching coach for Los Angeles' Triple–A affiliate, the Oklahoma City Dodgers.

== Pitching style ==
"That feeling at the end of that inning, that's why us relievers play baseball. That feeling – that's the feeling we chase. And the only way to get that feeling is to get out of a jam. So we invite those situations. You'd rather not deal with them. There's nothing better than a clean scoreless inning. But that feeling you get, that's what you are chasing every time, so every time you feel it, it's an amazing feeling, and you want to feel it as much as possible."

— De Fratus summarizing his love for pitching

A fastball and a slider comprise De Fratus's pitching repertoire; his fastball averages about 93 miles per hour (150 km/h), but occasionally touches 95 miles per hour (153 km/h), while his slider is about 10 miles per hour (16 km/h) slower than that. His slider was able to "dominate the league" in 2014, and although he does not total as many strikeouts as some relievers, he has established himself as a dependable piece in the Phillies' bullpen. Early in his career, De Fratus aspired to be a closer, but after realizing that an "all-or-nothing" mentality was not necessarily conducive to success, he sought to relax more and focus on being a quality setup reliever, projecting confidence on the mound. Especially in the Phillies' young bullpen, the need for reliable late-innings relievers was great, underscoring the importance of De Fratus's emergence. He is most successful when he utilizes a lower arm angle, and works quickly on the mound.

== Personal life ==
De Fratus is a devout Roman Catholic who, though he was raised in a large Catholic family, struggled with his faith after an injury early in his career, but ultimately determined the injury was a gift from God to help him better understand his faith: "I really feel that the setback was God telling me, ‘Hey you are not done. You are not done yet figuring out what you need to figure out, and I am going to give you a little more time.’ There is a big reason why that injury happened and I feel that I used it as best as I could have." He noted that he would like to take classes at a seminary to help proselytize to others. Early in his professional career, he struggled to find fellow Catholics, and noted that most of his teammates were either Protestants or not religious. Moreover, in many small towns that house minor league teams, there are no Catholic churches, so De Fratus found it easy to slide away from leading a Catholic lifestyle. However, upon realizing that there is more to life than material success, he discovered a need for God, and has thus developed his faith. Aside from his faith, he enjoys writing and recording music, and playing the guitar. He has two brothers, the older of whom, Steve, played in the minor leagues, and the younger of whom, Chris, caught a foul ball during De Fratus's major league debut.

During the offseason preceding the 2015 season, De Fratus became involved in some controversy involving Phillies blogger Bill Baer and the Black Lives Matter campaign when he tweeted, "I'm sick of this black vs white and men vs women garbage that's been going on. We're just people. #AllLivesMatter," to which Baer responded with a scathing column on Crashburn Alley, a blog affiliated with ESPN, in which he stated that De Fratus is "complicit in perpetuating a system which inflicts violence on those who didn’t have the luxury of being born white and male and straight and in an economically-stable area." Subsequently, De Fratus penned a retort to Baer via Facebook, in which he commented, "I sincerely hope that you will take the time to talk to me personally next time before you decide to hide behind your computer screen and criticize me, my upbringing and my character based on 140 characters. I do not apologize for anything I have said. I have a platform and I WILL use it for the agenda of love."
