= Ala Qattawi =

Jordanian-American automotive engineer

Ala Qattawi is a Jordanian and American automotive engineer whose research focuses on the manufacture of metal forms by origami-like foldforming of sheet metal and by additive manufacturing. She is an associate professor in the Department of Mechanical, Industrial and Manufacturing Engineering at the University of Toledo, where she heads the Integrated Design and Manufacturing Lab.

== Education and career ==
Qattawi is originally from Jordan, where her father was an English teacher; she became interested in engineering through watching him repair things in his home workshop. She received a bachelor's degree in industrial engineering in 2007 at the Jordan University of Science and Technology, as "the top of her class". She came to Clemson University in 2008 for a master's degree in mechanical engineering, and joined their doctoral program in automotive engineering in 2009, focusing her doctoral research on origami methods in sheet metal forming. When she completed her Ph.D. in 2012, she became the first woman in the US to earn a doctorate in automotive engineering.

She continued at Clemson as a postdoctoral researcher, and from 2015 to 2018 became an assistant professor of mechanical engineering at the University of California, Merced. She moved to the University of Toledo in 2019, and was promoted to associate professor in 2024.

== Recognition ==
In 2018, the Society of Manufacturing Engineers named Qattawi as one of their Outstanding Young Manufacturing Engineers. Qattawi was the 2021 recipient of the Ralph R. Teetor Educational Award of the Society of Automotive Engineers.

Clemson University's Department of Automotive Engineering named her as a distinguished alumna in 2023.
