= Teenie Matlock =

American cognitive scientist

- Occupation: Professor Emerita
- Awards: Jeffrey L. Elman Prize for Scientific Achievement and Community Building (2023) Athena Award for Academic Leadership – CITRIS Women in Tech Initiative (2021) Senate Award for Excellence in Faculty Mentorship (2016)

Academic background
- Education: CSU Fresno (BA and MA); UC Santa Cruz (PhD)

Academic work
- Discipline: Cognitive Science
- Institutions: UC Merced

Teenie Matlock (born 1958) is a cognitive scientist known for research that focuses on the meaning of everyday language and the extent to which context influences this meaning. Her research has deepened understanding of the impact of language and communication in cognition and politics, as well as climate science. As a leading researcher on the meaning of words in discussions of climate change, Matlock has been asked to weigh in on the value of shared language between energy companies and groups advocating for immediate changes to protect the environment. She recently retired and now holds the position of Professor Emerita of Cognitive Science at University of California, Merced.

Teenie Matlock received the 2015–2016 Senate Award for Excellence in Faculty Mentorship at UC Merced for successful mentoring of faculty and creating a positive environment for faculty to be successful. Her contributions as a leader and community builder were again recognized in 2021, when she received the Athena Award for Academic Leadership from CITRIS Women in Tech Initiative and in 2023 when she received the Elman Prize for Scientific Achievement and Community Building from the Cognitive Science Society.

== Early life and education ==
Teenie Matlock grew up in Mariposa, California. She was the eldest of five children, growing up in impoverished conditions. Her family ancestry includes Native American heritage, from the Southern Sierra Miwuk Nation, from both her mother's and father's sides, as well as lineage tracing back to Gold Rush miners. In 1976, she graduated from Mariposa High School. None of her family at that point had attended college.

Matlock began her post-secondary education as a first-generation student at Fresno City College where her initial focus was on being a trumpet player. She earned her B.A. in Liberal Studies in 1983, followed by an M.A. in Linguistics in 1985, both from California State University, Fresno. She attended graduate school at the University of California, Santa Cruz where she obtained her Ph.D. in Cognitive Psychology in 2001. Working under the supervision of Raymond Gibbs, Jr., her dissertation research focused on how fictive motion figurative language that uses motion verbs with nouns that do not typically move (e.g., "A road crosses the street"), is understood.

== Career ==
Matlock did her postdoctoral research at Stanford University, where she continued her work on fictive motion. In 2004, she became a founding faculty member at the University of California, Merced where she and Jeff Yoshimi worked closely together to design the first Cognitive Science undergraduate courses and determine the structure and requirements for the Cognitive Science major. As part of her work to develop a highly reputable Cognitive Science Department at UC Merced, she applied for and received a National Science Foundation grant that allowed her to host a 2009 conference at UC Merced on the "Future of Cognitive Science."

She has served as associate editor for the journal Cognitive Linguistics and has also participated on the editorial boards of Cognitive Science and Environmental Communication. She currently serves on the editorial board of Metaphor and Symbol, a journal focused on the study of metaphor and other figurative devices in language.

Matlock has also worked to support the interests of Native Americans in her community. She has been an active participant in the American Indian Council of Mariposa County and has worked to forge connections between UC Merced and the local native population. She helped to create the Toloma 5K Run and designed Toloma Grove as a place on the UC Merced campus for reflection in honor of Native American people. She helped get the UC System to make tuition free to California Native students of federally recognized tribes. In January 2023, Matlock joined UC Santa Cruz as Special Advisor to the Chancellor on Indigenous Relations for the purpose of providing leadership and advice on Native initiatives. In June 2023, she spoke at a Mariposa County Board of Supervisors Meeting in support of the Mariposa Gateway Elements Project to recognize the Miwuk people with physical structures in town.

Matlock has also continued to play trumpet. She performed with the G Street Revolution, a UC Merced faculty band, in 2017 and has played Taps at the closing portion of the Memorial Day Service in Mariposa in 2024.

== Research ==
Matlock's research on fictive motion has demonstrated that the way we process this type of figurative language is comparable to the way we process and engage in actual motion. Matlock's subsequent research demonstrated that engaging with fictive motion sentences influences people's understanding of time. In this study, after reading and illustrating a fictive motion sentence like The bike path runs alongside the creek, study participants were more likely to answer the statement and question Next Wednesday's meeting has been moved forward two days. What day is the meeting now that it has been rescheduled? with the answer Friday rather than Monday, in contrast to those who read the non-figurative sentence The bike path is next to the creek. Findings suggested that participants' thinking about time was influenced by imagining the forward motion in the fictive motion sentence. This finding was replicated in two subsequent studies in the paper. The work has deepened scientific understanding of how people process figurative language.

Her research on how people understand grammar and metaphors has also led to practical applications, demonstrating how these language elements influence people's attitudes about climate change and political candidates. Matlock has examined the impact of using different verb forms to describe a fictional political candidate's past actions on potential voters' attitudes, e.g., whether study participants think a politician with a problematic past would be reelected and how confident they were in that assessment. In this work, Matlock demonstrated that participants had a less favorable view of a candidate's negative behavior when these past actions were described with verbs of the form was verb+ing as opposed to verb+ed. For example, participants who read about the politician who last year was having an affair with his assistant and was taking hush money from a prominent constituent were significantly more confident in their belief that he would not be reelected in comparison to those respondents that read last year this politician had an affair with his assistant and took hush money from a prominent constituent.

Additionally, participants in the was verb+ing condition gave higher estimates of the amount of hush money the politician took than respondents estimated in the verb+ed condition. Matlock also found that messages containing information about a candidate's negative and positive past behaviors were viewed less favorably when the negative behavior was expressed in the was verb+ing form and the positive behavior was expressed in the verb+ed form, as compared to when the conditions were reversed. The findings are particularly relevant when considering how the use of language may influence voters' perceptions of a political candidate and their voting preferences. Similarly, her studies of the use of war or race metaphors to describe climate change showed that using a war metaphor made people more attuned to the urgency and risk associated with climate change than the use of a race metaphor.

== Representative publications ==
- Bergen, Benjamin K.; Lindsay, Shane; Matlock, Teenie; Narayanan, Srini (10 September 2007). "Spatial and Linguistic Aspects of Visual Imagery in Sentence Comprehension". Cognitive Science. 31 (5): 733–764. doi:10.1080/03640210701530748. PMID 21635316.
- Flusberg, Stephen J.; Matlock, Teenie; Thibodeau, Paul H. (2 January 2018). "War metaphors in public discourse". Metaphor and Symbol. 33 (1): 1–18. doi:10.1080/10926488.2018.1407992.
- Gibbs, Raymond W.; Matlock, Teenie (2008). "Metaphor, imagination, and simulation". The Cambridge Handbook of Metaphor and Thought. pp. 161–176. doi:10.1017/CBO9780511816802.011. ISBN 978-0-511-81680-2.
- Matlock, Teenie (December 2004). "Fictive motion as cognitive simulation". Memory & Cognition. 32 (8): 1389–1400. doi:10.3758/BF03206329. PMID 15900932.
- Matlock, Teenie; Ramscar, Michael; Boroditsky, Lera (8 July 2005). "On the Experiential Link Between Spatial and Temporal Language". Cognitive Science. 29 (4): 655–664. doi:10.1207/s15516709cog0000_17. PMID 21702788.
