= Rio School District =

School district in Ventura County, California

Address
- 1800 Solar Drive Oxnard, California, 93030; United States

District information
- Grades: K–8
- Established: 1885
- Superintendent: John D. Puglisi, Ph.D.
- Schools: 9
- NCES District ID: 0632760

Students and staff
- Enrollment: 5,219 (2018–19)
- Teachers: 228.80 (FTE)
- Student–teacher ratio: 22.81

Other information
- Website: Rio School District

Rio School District is a school district in Ventura County, California. The district serves K–8 students in the northeast portion of the city of Oxnard and the unincorporated communities of El Rio and Nyeland Acres. Rio feeds into the Oxnard Union High School District, specifically Rio Mesa and Pacifica High Schools.

== History ==
The Rio School District was founded in 1885 with the opening of a one-room schoolhouse on a ranch in what is now El Rio. The first class had at most 13 students.

In 2018, the district purchased a new headquarters building on Solar Drive in northeast Oxnard. The office space is shared with the Oxnard Union High School District, who relocated from their previous facilities on K Street in the flight path of Oxnard Airport.

== Schools ==
=== Elementary schools ===
- Rio del Mar Elementary School
- Rio del Norte Elementary School
- Rio Lindo Elementary School
- Rio Plaza Elementary School
- Rio Rosales Elementary School

=== Middle schools ===
- Rio del Valle Middle School
- Rio Vista Middle School

=== K—8 schools ===
- Rio del Sol K–8 School / Rio del Sol - STEAM Academy
- Rio Real K–8 School / Rio Real Dual Immersion Academy
