= University of Jyväskylä =

Public university in Finland

- Jyväskylän yliopisto
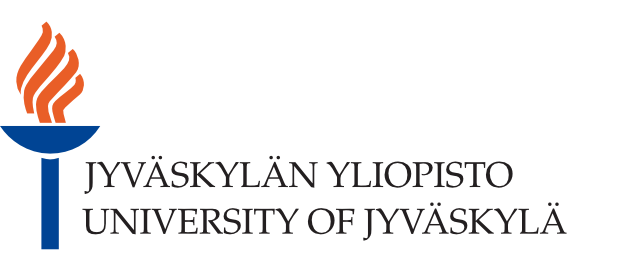
- Motto: Amica veritas
- Motto in English: Truth is a friend
- Type: Public university
- Established: 1863; 163 years ago
- Rector: Jari Ojala
- Faculty: 1,800 (2025)
- Administrative staff: 950 (2025)
- Students: 15 200 (and 25 800 adult education students)
- Undergraduates: 7200 (2025)
- Postgraduates: 6260 (2025)
- Doctoral students: 1700 (2025)
- Location: Jyväskylä, Finland; 62°14′11″N 25°43′58″E
- Campus: Urban
- Colors: Blue and orange
- Website: www.jyu.fi/en

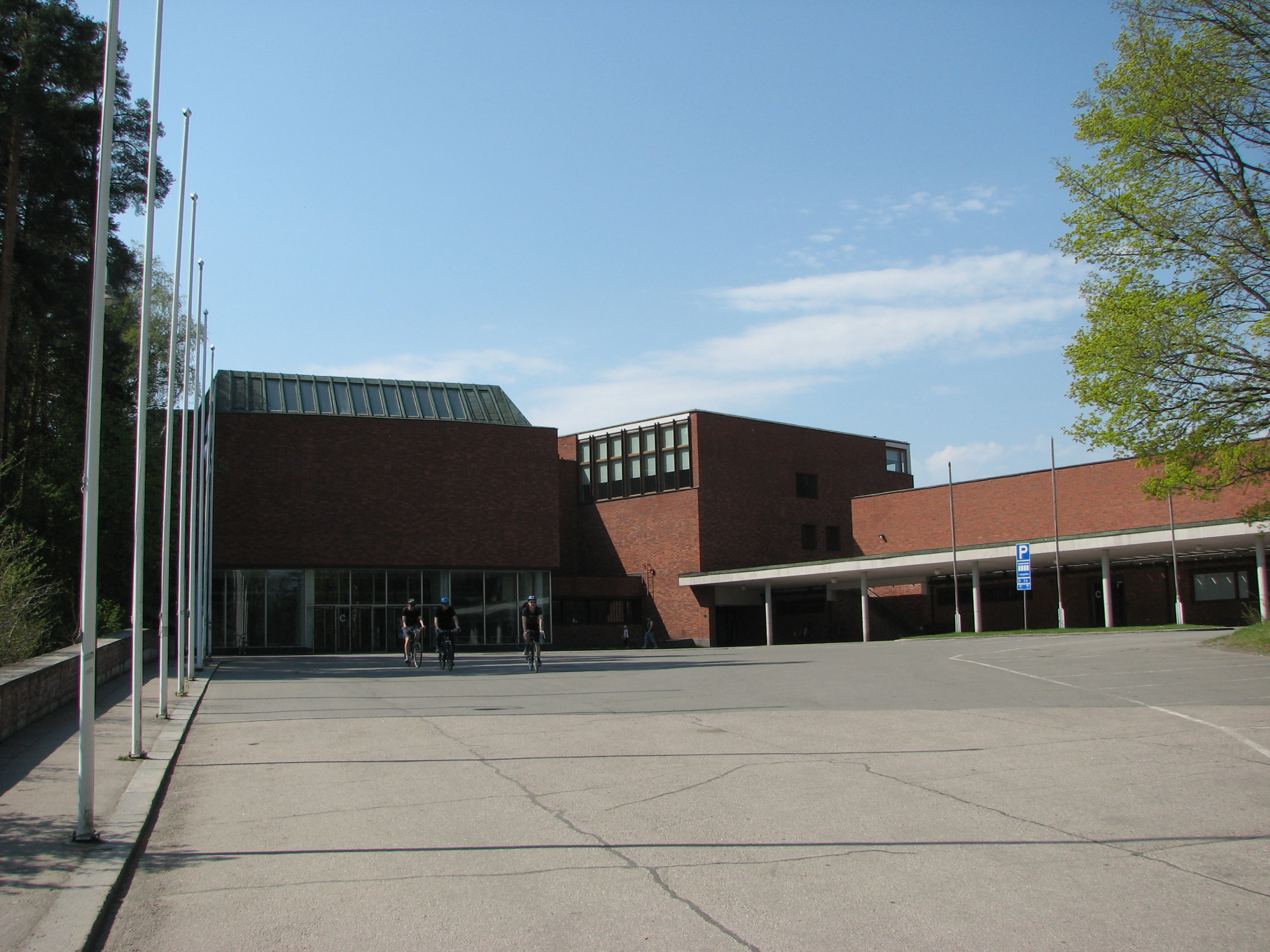
The main building Capitolium

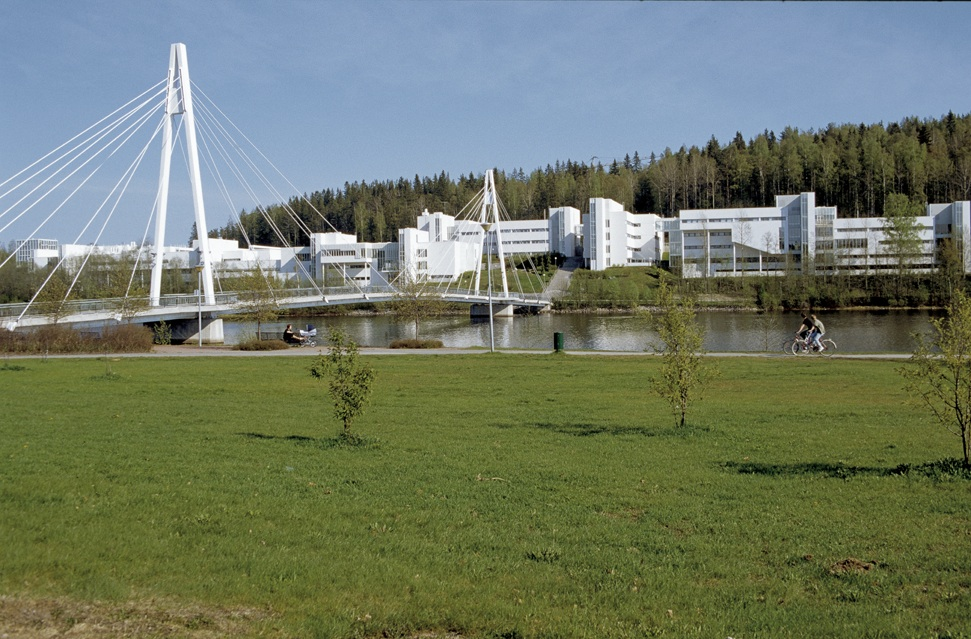
Ylistönrinne campus

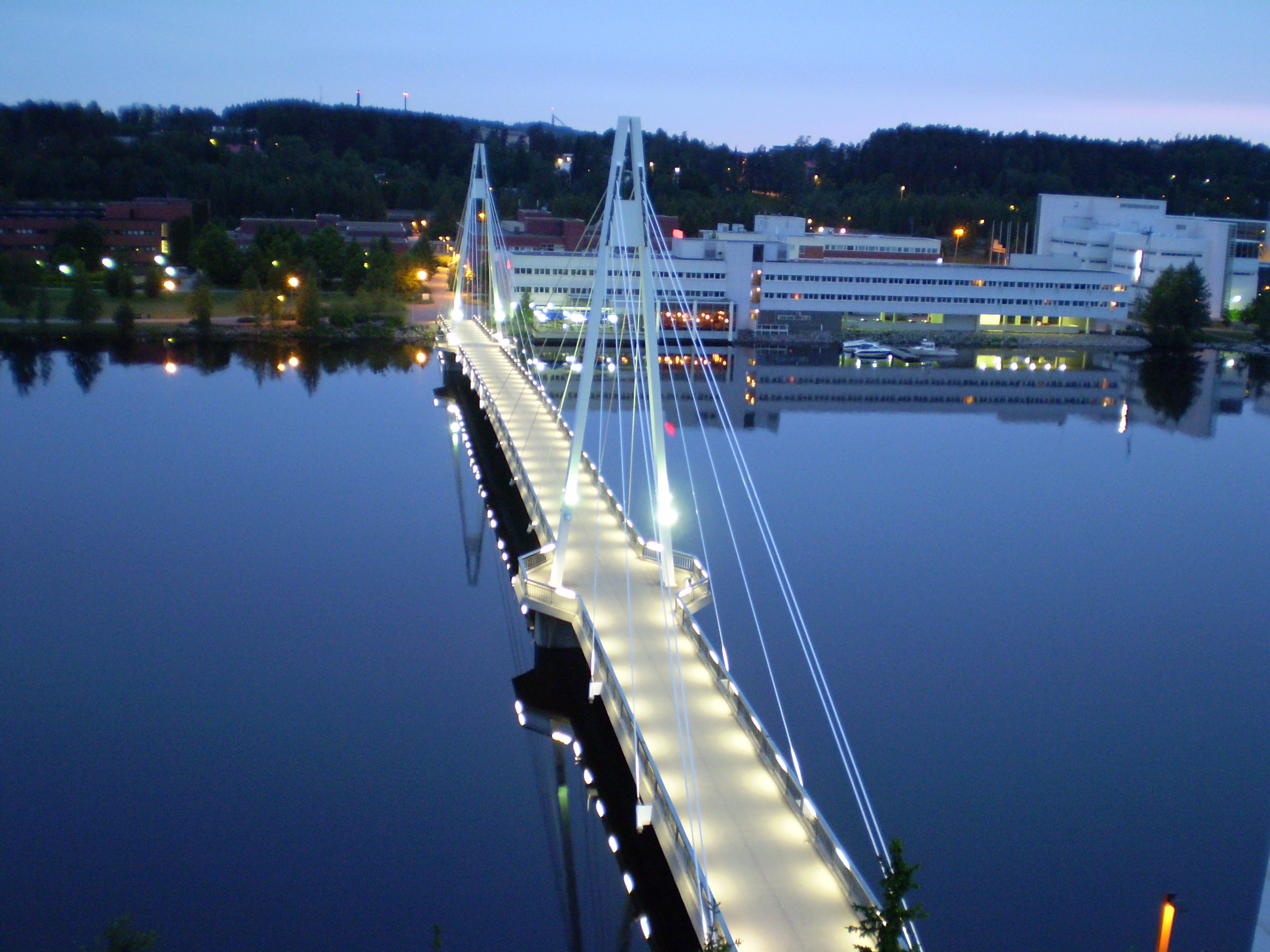
Mattilanniemi campus

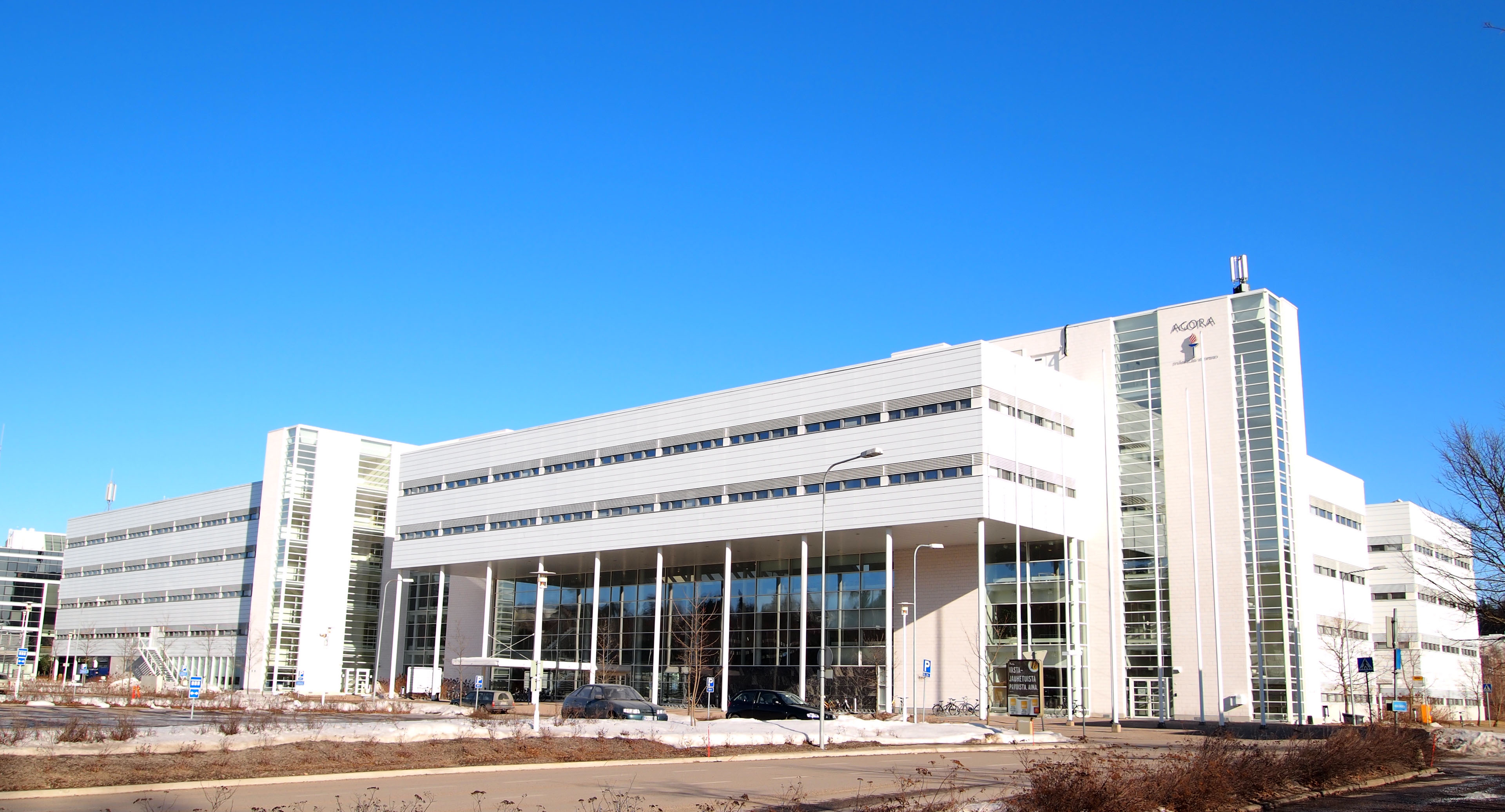
Agora building at the Mattilanniemi campus

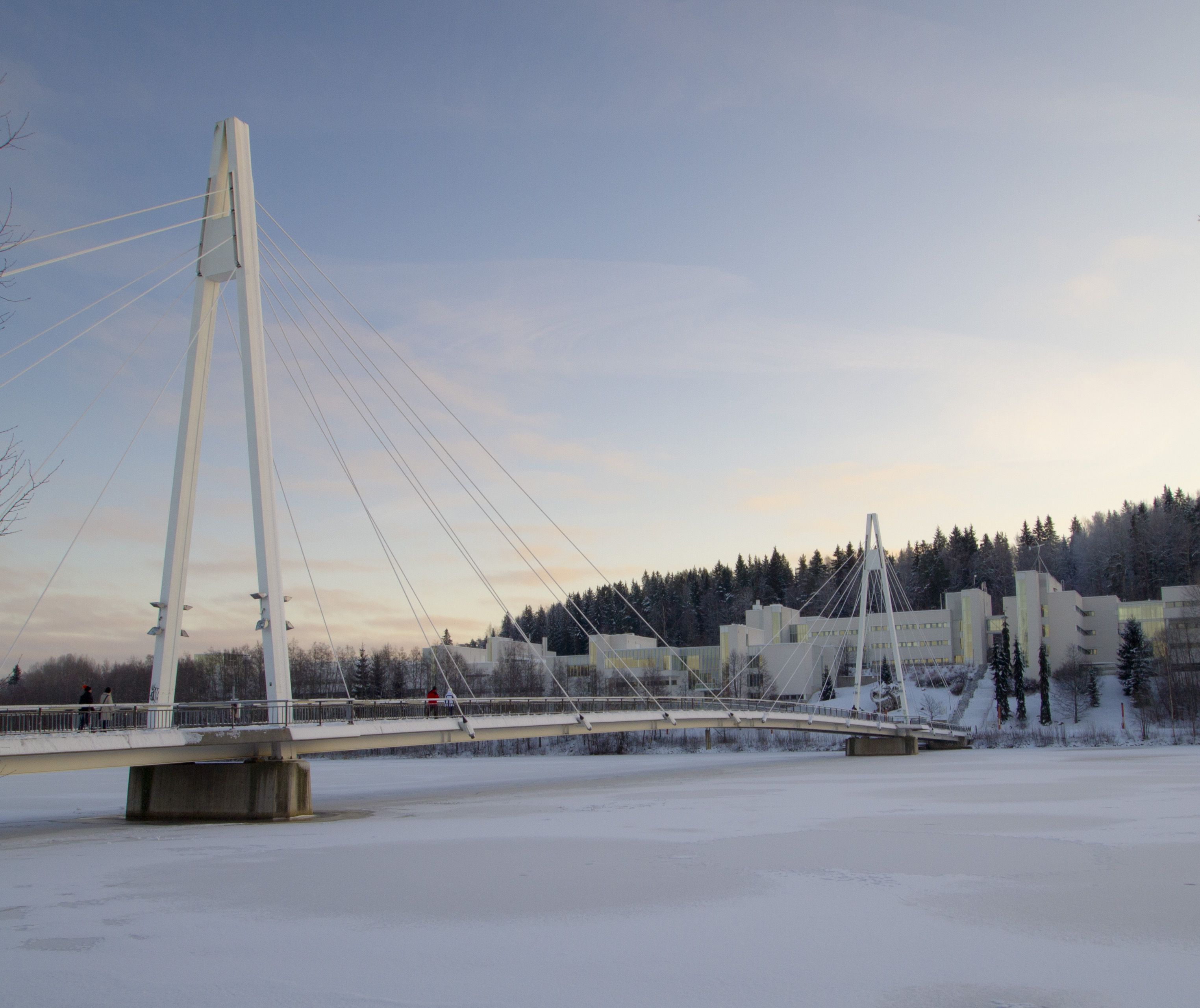
Ylistönrinne at winter

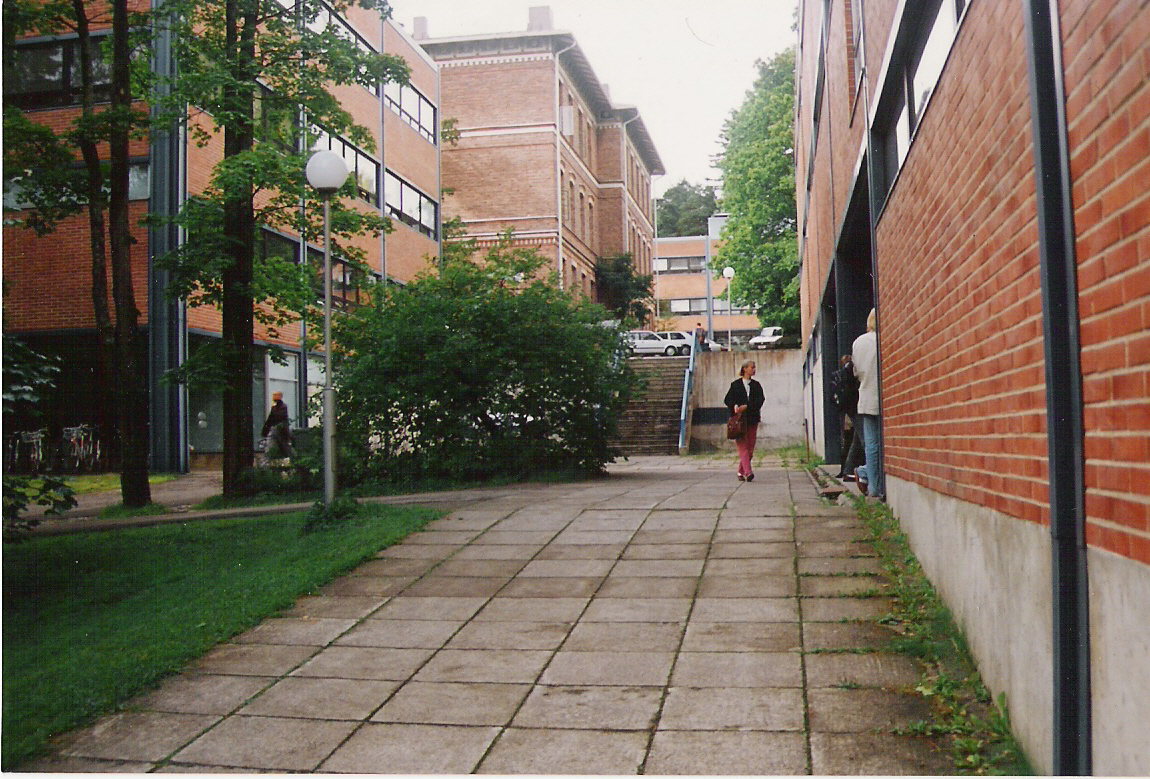
Seminaarinmäki campus

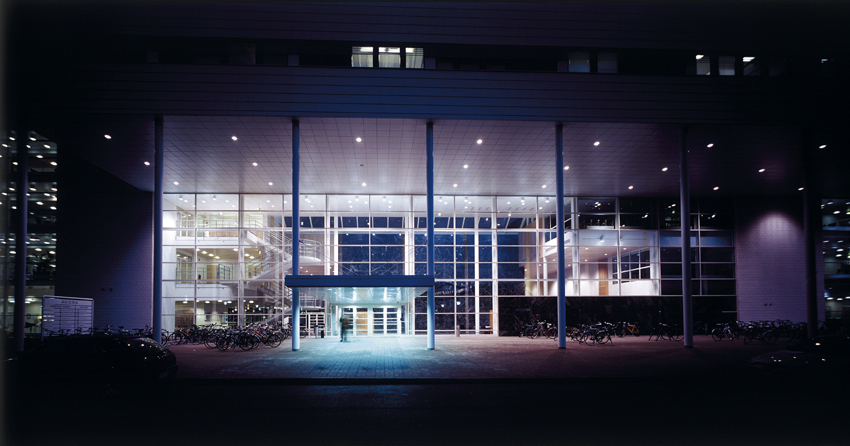
Agora building main entrance

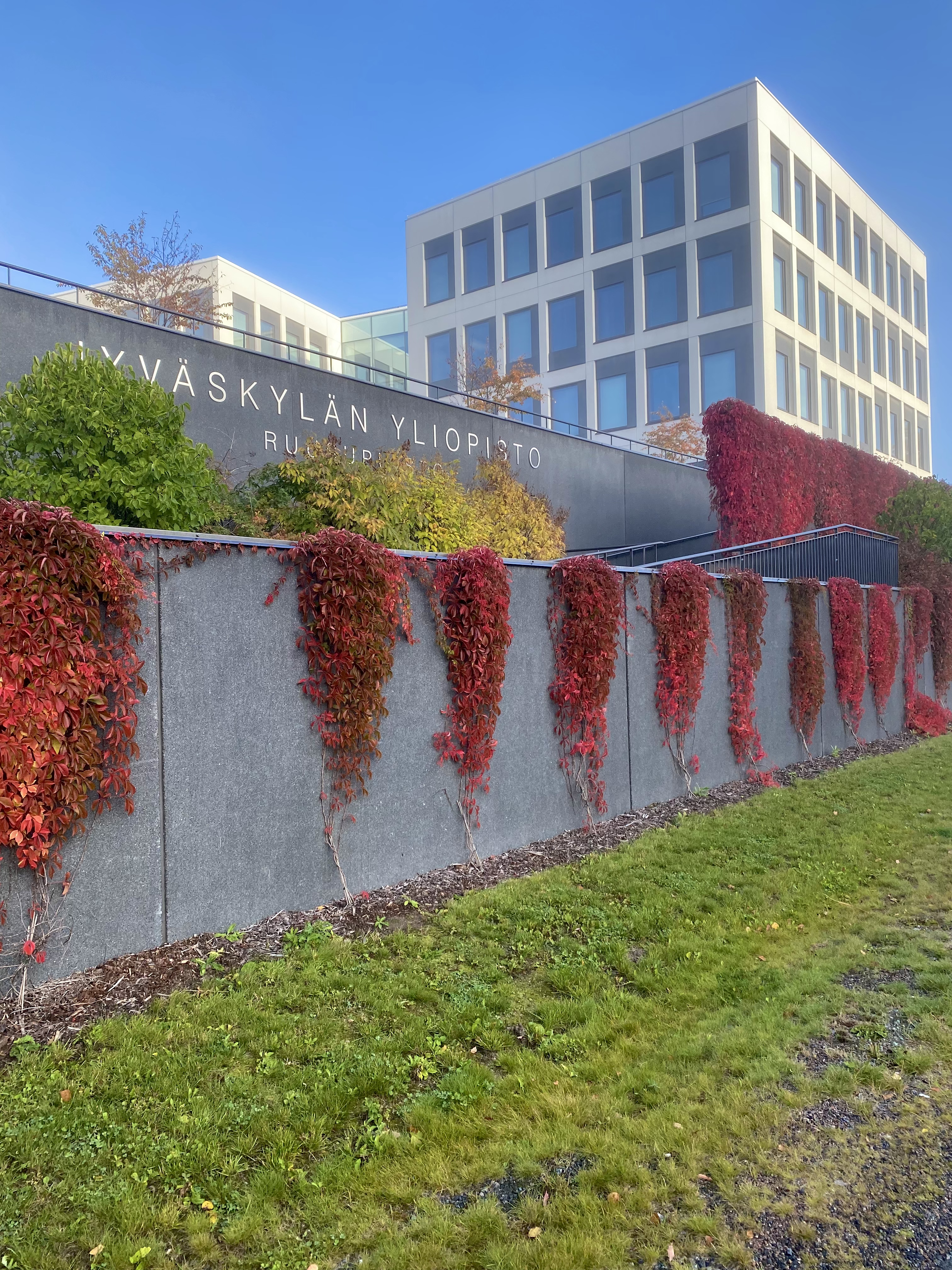
University of Jyväskylä, Ruusupuisto campus in the morning fog

The University of Jyväskylä (Finnish: Jyväskylän yliopisto, JYU) is a public research university in Jyväskylä, Finland. It has its origins in the first Finnish-speaking Teacher Training College (the so-called Teacher Seminary), founded in 1863. Around 15,200 students are currently enrolled in the degree programs of the university.

== History ==
Founded in 1863, the university has its origins in the first Finnish-speaking teacher training college, the so-called Teacher Seminary. Uno Cygnaeus was enthusiastic to educate the people and created a programme for organising primary school education in Finland. Cygnaeus' plan was realised in 1863, when a teacher seminary was established in Jyväskylä, on the current university campus. Based on the town's central location, the first Finnish-medium secondary schools for boys and girls were also established in Jyväskylä. The foundation of the world-famous school system was created at the University of Jyväskylä. The teacher seminary evolved into the College of Education in 1937, at which time it was given the authority to grant doctorate degrees. In the 1960s, the college started teaching and researching in the sciences and in 1967 was renamed the University of Jyväskylä.

In contemporary times, the University of Jyväskylä is both a nationally and internationally significant research university with expertise in education and a focus on human and natural sciences. The university is Finland's leading expert in teacher training and adult education, as well as a major exporter of education. The Faculty of Sport and Health Sciences is the only one of its kind in the country.

The university offers a wide range of study programmes for master's degree conducted in English, many of which are unique in Finland. Natural Sciences, Human Sciences, Sports and Health Sciences as well as Teacher education are the university's areas of special expertise.

== Size ==
The university has around 15,200 students, in addition to its adult education students, representing nearly 40,000 students in total. Each year around 2,800 new students are admitted and generally only a seventh of applicants are accepted; this makes University of Jyväskylä one of the most popular and selective universities in Finland. Measured according to the number of master's degrees conferred, the University of Jyväskylä is ranked as the second largest university in Finland.

== Organisation ==
The university offers undergraduate and postgraduate degrees, teacher training programmes and over 120 subject area disciplines.

The university is currently divided into six faculties:

- Faculty of Humanities and Social Sciences
- Faculty of Information Technology
- Faculty of Education and Psychology
- Faculty of Sport and Health Sciences
- Faculty of Mathematics and Science
- Jyväskylä University School of Business and Economics

Independent institutes in addition to faculties:

- Centre for Multilingual Academic Communication, Movi
- Finnish Institute for Educational Research
- Kokkola University Consortium Chydenius
- Open University
- Open Science Centre | University Library | University Museum

== Research centres and rankings ==
University rankings

Global – Overall
- ARWU World: 701–800 (2023)
- QS World: 498 (2026)
- THE World: 401–500 (2024)
- USNWR Global: =520 (2023)

Centres of Excellence in Research nominated by the Academy of Finland: 2026-2033

- Centre of Excellence in Quantum Materials
- Centre of Excellence in Neutron-Star Physics, coordinated by University of Helsinki

2022-2029

- Center of Excellence in Quark Matter, Physics
- Centre of Excellence in Learning Dynamics and Intervention Research, Psychology and Educational Sciences
- Centre of Excellence in Music, Mind, Body and Brain, Music
- Finnish Centre of excellence in Randomness and Structures, Mathematics, coordinated by University of Helsinki

2018-2025

- Research on Ageing and Care (Coordinated by Jyväskylä)
- Inverse Modelling and Imaging (Coordinated by Helsinki)
- Game Culture Studies (Coordinated by Tampere)

University of Jyväskylä in global rankings

In the global rankings, research activity at the JYU is among the top two to three percent of all universities.

Research funding

The university has succeeded well in acquiring competitive research funding - European Research Council funding as an example.

== International cooperation in education ==
The University of Jyväskylä aims to offer its students the opportunity to study abroad and internationalisation at home. Therefore, the University of Jyväskylä is active in a variety of international programmes, such as the Lifelong Learning Programme, Nordplus, north–south-South Higher Education Exchange, FIRST and ISEP. The university has also concluded bilateral agreements on student exchange with 25 universities around the world. Altogether, the university is involved in student exchanges with more than 360 universities worldwide. University of Jyväskylä is a member in the FORTHEM Alliance, a European University network, supported by the European Commission, bringing together nine European universities.

== Campuses ==
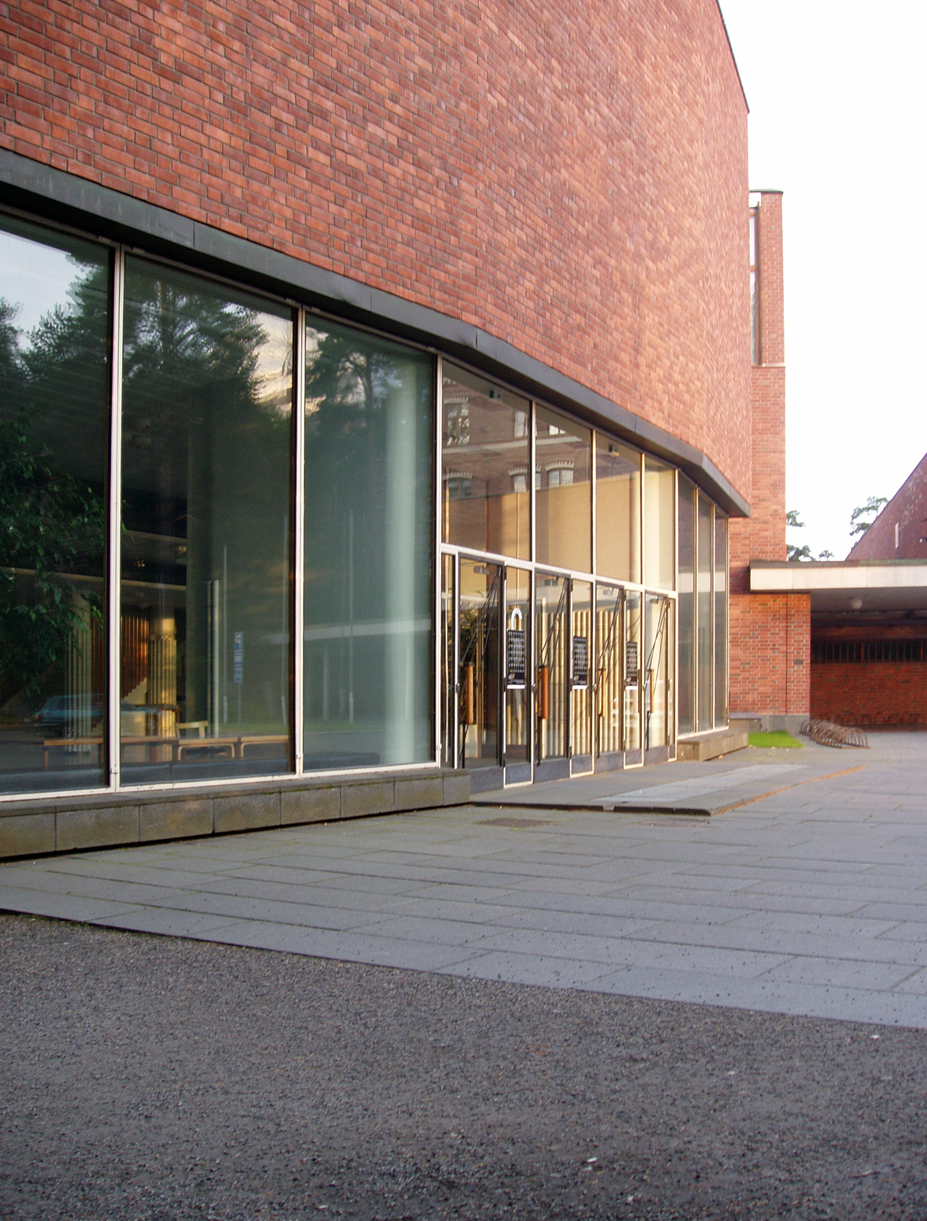
Aalto Campus, Main Building (1954-56)

The faculties and departments are mainly located on three campus areas: the Main Campus area in the city centre - where the original Teacher Seminary has first started - as well as Mattilanniemi and Ylistönrinne Campuses on opposite shores of Lake Jyväsjärvi, united by a bridge, some 10 minutes walk from the Main Campus area.

Several buildings in the main campus area were designed by famous Finnish architect Alvar Aalto. Aalto received the commission to design the College of Education campus following a competition held in 1951. Aalto played on the idea of Jyväskylä's image among the town's inhabitants as it being the "Athens of the North", and layout of the campus reflects principles of Greek acropolis layouts. His scheme even included a Greek-style open-air theatre, though executed in minimal form.

Buildings in the campus area designed by Alvar Aalto:

- Teachers Training School 1951-54
- Staff housing 1951 (now offices of the Jyväskylä University Museum, Building G)
- Student's Hall of Residence 1952-54 (Building Philologica, P)
- Lozzi and Lyhty staff and student refectories (P)
- Main Building 1954–1956, Building C
- Swimming Pool 1954–1958, 1964, several alterations (called Aalto-Alvari)
- Physical Education Building 1971
- Library 1957 (now the Aalto Reading Room)

In 1969-1970 an architectural competition was arranged for the design of new university campus sites at Mattilanniemi and Ylistönrinne. The competition was won by architect Arto Sipinen, who had previously worked in Aalto's office. Sipinen also designed new buildings for the main campus, including a new main library (1974).

The three campus areas of the university - Seminaarinmäki, Mattilanniemi and Ylistönrinne - constitute a multifaceted cultural and natural environment.

The Seminaarinmäki area is of particular interest as it depicts over 100 years of history of this institute of higher education. The three distinct eras in the history of the university, first as a Teacher Training College (Seminar) 1863–1937), then as the Jyväskylä College of Education (1934-1966), to its present-day university status (1966-) are reflected in the buildings dating from the different periods.

The Teacher Seminary complex comprised five red brick buildings from 1879 to 1883 by architect Constantin Kiseleff. The old Seminar buildings and the college buildings designed by Alvar Aalto are all listed as buildings protected by the law. In July 2026, the Aalto Campus, along with 12 other Aalto Works, was designated by UNESCO as a World Heritage Site.

Because of the need to build more facilities for the university, new buildings have been designed, many of them by architect Arto Sipinen. The Faculty of Education and Psychology has the most recently designed facility, Ruusupuisto ("Rose Park", 2015) by SARC Architects Ltd. The building got its name from a former park from the beginning of the 20th century. It was named after the many luxuriant rosebushes planted on its southern hill.

== Student Union ==
The Student Union of the University of Jyväskylä (JYY) is the students' very own organization. The basic task of the Student Union is to represent its members and protect their interests and rights at the university as well as in the surrounding society. All degree and exchange students enrolled in the University of Jyväskylä become members of the Student Union.

== Accommodation ==
=== Kortepohja Student Village ===
Kortepohja Student Village is owned by the Student Union of the University of Jyväskylä. Kortepohja, located about 2.5 kilometres from the Main Campus and city centre, housing approximately 1900 students.

=== Central Finland Student Housing Foundation, KOAS ===
KOAS offers ca. 3900 apartments all around the Jyväskylä town area. The apartment buildings are conveniently located in the suburbs of Jyväskylä.

== Notable people and alumni ==
- Alvar Aalto
- Jukka Ammondt
- Minna Canth
- Martin Hagger
- Faina Jyrkilä
- Martti J. Kari
- Seminaarinmäen mieslaulajat
- Sofi Oksanen
- Jutta Urpilainen
- Henna Virkkunen
- Majaliwa Kassim Majaliwa, prime minister of Tanzania, November 2015 – present.

== Rectors ==
- Kaarle Oksala 1934–1940
- Erik Ahlman 1940–1948
- Aarni Penttilä 1948–1962
- Martti Takala 1963–1967
- Ilppo Simo Louhivaara 1967–1977
- Kalevi Heinilä 1977–1982
- Martti Takala 1982–1988
- Antti Tanskanen 1988–1992
- Aino Sallinen 1992–2012
- Matti Manninen 2012–2017
- Keijo Hämäläinen from 1 August 2017 to 21 April 2023
- Maija-Leena Laakso 21 April to 14 August 2023
- Jari Ojala from 14 August 2023
