= List of University of California, Merced alumni =

This page lists notable alumni and students of the University of California, Merced. Notable faculty members are in the article List of University of California, Merced faculty.

== Arts and entertainment ==
- Shavone Charles – entrepreneur and musician

== Athletics ==
- Preeya Singh – soccer player
- Marco Torralva – soccer player

== Government, law, and public policy ==
- David Do – government official

== Media ==
- Oliver Darcy – journalist
