= Faina Jyrkilä =

Finnish sociologist (1917–2008)

- Born: 1 September 1917; Sortavala Finland
- Died: 28 January 2008 (aged 90); Jyväskylä Finland
- Occupation: sociologist
- Years active: 1964-1984

Faina Jyrkilä (1917-2008) was the first female Finnish sociologist. She was also one of the first sociologists to study ageing.

== Biography ==
Faina Jyrkilä was born on 1 September 1917 in Sortavala, Finland, graduating from high school in 1941 and completing a social work degree in 1945. Between 1952 and 1953, Jyrkilä attended school at Columbia University and Harvard. In 1960, she obtained the first Ph.D earned by a woman in sociology in Finland.

She was the first Finnish female professor of sociology and began teaching at the University of Jyväskylä in 1964. Having studied in the US, she was one of the first Finnish scholars to publish in English. She was one of the first generation of scholars to study gerontology and served on the board of the International Association of Gerontology (IAG). Jyrkilä was a respected teacher and academic and an expert in her field. She retired in 1984.

Jyrkilä died on 28 January 2008.

== Selected works ==
- "On the Cumulative Nature of Leisure Activities", Acta Sociologica, Vol. 3 No. 4, pp 165–172 (1959) (in English)
- "Conflict of Norms and the Behaviour of Recipients of Social Welfare Assistance in Finland", Sociologia Ruralis, Vol. 1 No. 1 pp 35–42 (December 1960) (in English)
- Society and adjustment to old age; a sociological study on the attitude of society and the adjustment of the aged Copenhagen: Munksgaard (1960) (in English)
- Huoltoavunsaajan vieraantuminen sosiaalisesta ympäristöstään Tampere: Yhteiskunnallisen korkeakoulun tutkimuslaitos (1963) (in Finnish)
- Ikä ja irtaantuminen vuorovaikutuksesta Tampere: Yhteiskunnallisen korkeakoulun tutkimuslaitos (1963) (in Finnish)
- A mechanism of inactivity; a study on recipients of public assistance Helsinki, Distributor: Academic Bookstore (1965) (in English)
- Tutkimusmuotoisen opetuksen merkityksestä sosiologiassa Jyväskylä (1970) (in Finnish)
- Gerontologia, eri tiedonaloja yhdistävä tiede Jyväskylä (1971) (in Finnish)
- The adjustment on the cold farm Jyväskylä: Jyväskylän yliopisto, sosiologian laitos (1973) (in English)
- The developmental process associated with major adult roles, cultural and subcultural differences: a case study of Karelian immigrants Jyväskylä: Jyväskylän yliopisto, sosiologian laitos (1975) (in English)
- Research in gerontology: Finnish and English summaries Jyväskylä: Dept. of Sociology, University of Jyväskylä (1981) (in English)
