= Rio Mesa High School =

Public high school in California, United States

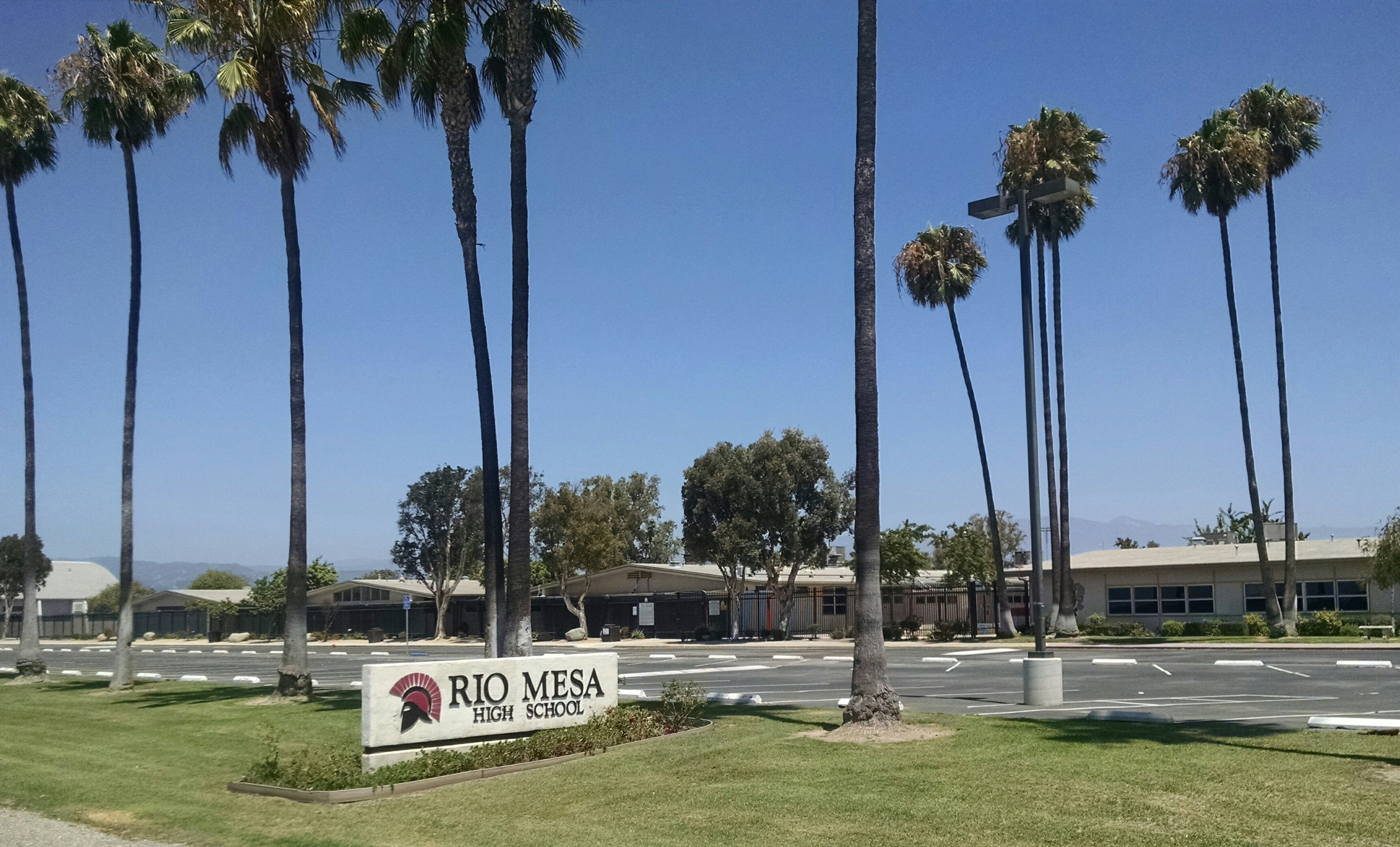

Location
- 545 Central Avenue; Oxnard, California 93036; United States; 34.252784°N 119.144541°W

Information
- Type: Public
- Motto: Once a Spartan, always a Spartan
- Established: 1965
- School district: Oxnard Union High School District
- Principal: Mark Contreras
- Teaching staff: 87.17 (FTE)
- Grades: 9–12
- Enrollment: 2,078 (2023–2024)
- Student to teacher ratio: 23.84
- Campus: rural
- Colors: Red and Black
- Athletics conference: CIF Southern Section; Channel League
- Nickname: Spartans
- Rival: Adolfo Camarillo High School
- Website: Rio Mesa High School

Rio Mesa High School (RMHS) is a high school in Ventura County, California. Located northeast of Oxnard, the school is surrounded by strawberry fields and other crops growing on the Oxnard Plain. The school is part of the Oxnard Union High School District (OUHSD). It serves a portion of northeast Oxnard (including the neighborhood of RiverPark) and western Camarillo as well as the unincorporated communities of El Rio, Strickland, and Nyeland Acres. The name "Rio Mesa", conceived by OUHSD board member Bob Matthews at the time of the school's founding in 1965, is derived from the two original elementary school districts that fed the school — Rio and Mesa Union; since then, it has also regularly received students from the Pleasant Valley and Oxnard Elementary districts. Rio Mesa High School offers the International Baccalaureate Diploma Program.

== History ==
Rio Mesa High School is surrounded on all four sides by agricultural fields; as such, the campus is subject to pesticide exposure. Rio Mesa has been at the center of a Title VI Civil Rights Act complaint since 1999, covering three generations. Title VI prohibits recipients of federal funding from discriminating based on race, color, or national origin. Such funding includes U.S. Environmental Protection Agency (EPA) grants that are routinely awarded to California pesticide regulators in millions of dollars. Plaintiffs in the case argue that California pesticide regulators violated Title VI by approving permits for toxins that disproportionately impacted Latino schoolchildren, who attended schools adjacent to fields with the highest methyl bromide levels in the state.

== Academics ==
Rio Mesa High School has offered the International Baccalaureate Diploma Program since 2008. It is the second school in Ventura County (after Newbury Park High School) and the only OUHSD campus to do so.

== Athletics ==
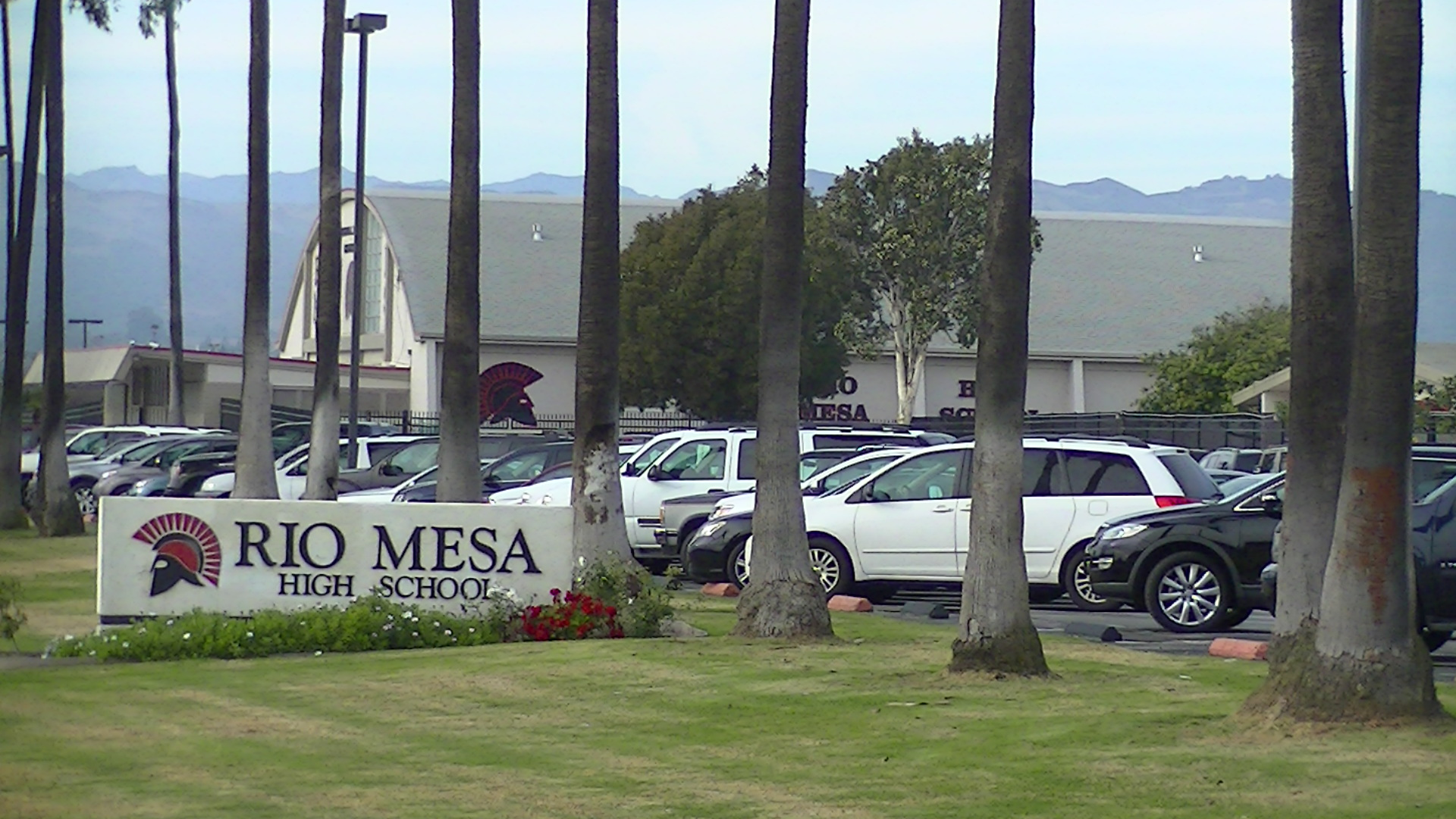
Rio Mesa High School

Rio Mesa High School athletic teams are nicknamed the Spartans. The school is a charter member of the Pacific View League, a conference within the CIF Southern Section (CIF-SS) that was established in 1998. Rio Mesa's main rival is Camarillo High School. The Spartans have a history of state and section championships, particularly in track and field.

The Rio Mesa football team won its first CIF-SS championship in 1971 under coach John Reardon, defeating Paso Robles High School 28–20 in the Division A title game.

Rio Mesa's on-campus pool opened in 2004, and since then, the school's aquatic sports have earned several CIF-SS championships. The RMHS boys' water polo team captured section titles in 2010, 2014, and 2015. In boys' swimming, the Spartans won a CIF-SS team title in 2015 and, as of the 2017 season, have won 111 consecutive Pacific View League meets and 18 league championships.

Rio Mesa won a boys' soccer championship in 2009, beating Pacific View League rival Channel Islands High School 2–1 after a fourth-place finish in the conference.

The Spartans have earned four CIF-SS baseball championships, all in the 1980s (1980, 1981, 1985, 1986).

In boys' golf, RMHS won a CIF-SS title in 1973. Coached by Ken Barone, the team featured Lee Michaels, Buddy, and Steve Carter. Barone's program sent 12 players to NCAA golf programs.

=== Track and field ===
Rio Mesa has a history of success in track and field. Brian FitzGerald 1981-2016 and Rick Torres 1983-2020 coached both the girls' and boys' teams. During their tenure, they developed many athletes, particularly sprinters and middle distance runners. Spartans runners have earned state championships in the girls' 100 meters at the CIF California State Meet in four consecutive decades: Angela Burnham (1980s), Marion Jones (1990s), Valexsia Droughn (2000s), and Zaria Francis (2010s); Burnham won both the 100 m and 200 m sprint titles while leading Rio Mesa to the girls' team championship in 1991. Jones also won multiple state titles while at Rio Mesa and later after transferring to Thousand Oaks High School, including both sprints four years in a row. Both Burnham and Jones were named the Track and Field News Girls' High School Athlete of the Year twice and Gatorade Player of the Year.

The Rio Mesa boys' team came within three-thousandths of a second of sweeping both relay events at the 2012 CIF California State Meet, winning the 4 x 400 meters relay but losing the 4 x 100 m relay in the last step of the race. Blake Selig, Darion Zimmerman, and Cameron Roach ran on both teams, Anthony Teart ran the 4 x 400 m, while Roderick White led off the 4 x 100 m. In addition to Francis winning the 100 m and 200 m, Greg Vann Jr. won the 2015 state championship for long jump with a leap of 24 feet 6 inches (7.47 m).

== Notable alumni ==
- Jaime Ambriz (1996): former professional soccer player
- Shane Austin (2007): Arena Football League quarterback
- Bobby Ayala (1987): former Major League Baseball pitcher
- Jessica L. Blois (1996) paleoecologist, climate change scientist
- Mike and Bob Bryan (1996): professional tennis players who combined for 45 Grand Slam titles and 2 Olympic gold medals
- Justin De Fratus (2005): Philadelphia Phillies pitcher
- Dave England (1987): stunt performer who appeared in the Jackass television series and films
- Scott Fujita (1997): former New Orleans Saints linebacker, Super Bowl XLIV champion, Vice-President of the NFLPA
- Ross Harris (1987): actor, artist, and musician
- Randy "Scott" Holman (1975): former New York Mets pitcher (1983–1984)
- Marion Jones: former world champion track and field athlete, disqualified from the Olympics (transferred to Thousand Oaks High School after sophomore year)
- Charlie Kimball: IndyCar driver; first professional driver with type 1 diabetes.
- Michele Serros (1984): author
- Kevin Thomas (2005): former Indianapolis Colts cornerback
- Blake Wingle (1978): former NFL offensive guard
- Dmitri Young (1991): former first baseman for the Washington Nationals; retired after being diagnosed with diabetes

== See also ==
- Angelita C. et al. v. California Department of Pesticide Regulation
