= Manuel Martín-Rodríguez =

Spanish-American linguist and writer

- Born: Manuel M. Martín-Rodríguez
- Education: University of Seville; University of Houston; University of California, Santa Barbara
- Occupations: Linguist, writer

Manuel M. Martín-Rodríguez is a Spanish-American linguist and writer. He is a distinguished professor in the department of literatures and languages at the University of California, Merced.

In 2017, Martín-Rodríguez wrote the book Life in Search of Readers: Reading (in) Chicano/a Literature, published by the University of New Mexico Press.
