= Mark Matsumoto =

American wastewater treatment engineer

Mark Matsumoto is an American engineer specializing in water and wastewater treatment, especially land-based treatment systems and hazardous waste site remediation. He was the former Dean of the UC Merced School of Engineering and an Elected Fellow of the American Association for the Advancement of Science.
