= Foldforming =

Metalworking technique

Foldforming is a technique of metalworking whereby metal is folded, repeatedly forged and annealed, and unfolded; at which stage it generally has a dramatic new three-dimensional form. While alternate spellings abound (e.g., fold-forming, fold forming, Foldforming, and even form-folding, the definitive book "Foldforming" by Charles Lewton-Brain consistently uses the spelling of foldforming as one lowercase word.

== Origins ==
The original technique of foldforming was originated and developed in the late 1980s by Charles Lewton-Brain, an English-born goldsmith who lived and studied in Tanzania, the United States, and Germany before moving to Canada. In the 1980s, the technique of foldforming metal was developed by Charles Lewton-Brain, who from a young age was interested in art and was inspired to pursue his interest in jewelry by his girlfriend's mother. In 1974 he went to the Nova Scotia College of Art and Design, where he studied jewelry-making and metalsmithing. After his college career, Christian Gaudernack, one of the NASCAD professors and a Norwegian goldsmith, inspired Lewton-Brain to continue his education, and he went on to attend the Fachhochschule fur Gestaltung, an art and design university in Pforzheim Germany. Lewton-Brain worked as a part-time goldsmith. During his time in the metals program, he was instructed by Klaus Ullrich, a postwar metalsmith. Ullrich was the person that helped Lewton-Brain to develop the foldforming technique. Ullrich emphasized to his students the importance of comprehending the properties of metal in order to understand how metal forms. Charles Lewton-Brain was able to develop his foldforming technique by seeing the characteristics of the metal as it is folded, unfolded, forged, rolled, annealed, and worked on. He brought about a new style of metalworking that had some connection to nature. His technique focused on the metal's natural reaction to being hammered and heated, based on his understanding of the metals elastic and ductile characteristics that were part of his instruction by Klaus Ullrich. Lewton-Brain continued to teach the foldforming technique to people at workshops and at Alberta College of Art and Design as the Head of Metals and Jewelry, having been part of this institute since 1986. By 1991, Lewton-Brain was winning awards for the technique and in 1997 workshops demonstrating the technique were at the core of the "Touch the Future" portion of the JCK International Jewelry Show in Orlando, Florida.

== Applications ==
When foldforming was first developed by Charles Lewton-Brain, it was mostly used in creative artwork or jewelry. Metalsmiths or artists turn a 2-dimensional into a 3-dimensional figure. The outcome of these 3-dimension is determined on how many times the sheet metal is folded, unfolded, annealed, and forged (hammered on an anvil). Artists like Charles Lewton-Brain have added these natural figures as a part of their art and jewelry. Jewelry, such as earrings or necklaces, can be made with foldforming. For some artists or students trying to become artists, like Ball State University graduate student Rachael Jobst, using this technique can be helpful when making leaves or flowers for an art piece. There are other applications to foldforming. Manufacturers have been able to apply this process to help them produce cheaper automobiles. When processing some parts of the vehicle, like the frame and body, the metal that is used go through a process of press-based stamping, a comparatively more complicated method of producing the car's body. With foldforming, manufacturers are able to cut costs and time for manufacturing because of the reduced need for tools and additional operations required with press-based stamping. Also, with foldforming, the metal sheets used take advantage of the flexibility of the material, reducing the chance of cracks and wear.

== Resemblance ==
Many of the shapes and forms that come out of foldforming resemble many things seen in nature, and utilizes laws of nature in the creation process. The most common shapes created using foldforming are flowers, leaves or horns of a ram, as these require the repeated process of folding, annealing, unfolding, and hammering of sheet metal that foldforming also involves. The process of a flower unfolding or how a leaf forms is similar between natural occurrences and foldforming. With this, artists are able to obtain a better understanding of how to incorporate nature's natural beauty into their artwork. With metalsmiths, this technique requires them to push their material to the limit so they'll be able to have a better understanding of what they will be able to make based on the material's ductility and elasticity. Another resemblance that foldforming has is the paper fold technique known as "origami". The process of folding and unfolding a flat material is seen in both metal foldforming and papering folding origami. Many of the principles and issues that come with the folding and unfolding process can be seen in origami and foldforming. With this similarity some artists create a paper origami model of their project before working with sheet metal. The difficulty with this is that paper and sheet metal are materials with very different properties, so artist are still limited to the materials' limits of malleability. Paper material is able to bend more freely but incapable of sustaining a folded form as easily as sheet metal, and sheet metal is a thicker and tougher material to work with.

== Folding technique ==
Hundreds of folds have now been categorized. Charles Lewton-Brain was able to come up with four basic steps to foldforming.

- Step one: fold the sheet metal over itself. This creates the bent shape in the sheet metal.
- Step two: forge (hammer) or roll the metal. By doing this, metalsmiths are either creating the main form of the figure or making the area where the metal is folded more distinctive.
- Step three: anneal the metal. This is just heating the sheet metal enough for it to be easier to work with.
- Step four: unfold the sheet metal revealing its form.

All four steps act upon the characteristics of metals.

== Tools ==
Techniques now include the use of traditional forging tools like various types of hammers, mallets, and anvils. Other tools consist of rolling mills, vice grips, pliers, embedding wire, other objects into the folds. and a heat source. The heat source can be some kind of forge, a blowtorch, or anything hot enough to anneal the metal.

== Literature ==
- Lewton-Brain, Charles (2008.), Foldforming. Hong Kong: Brynmorgen Press. ISBN 978-1-929565-26-9
- Muttitt, Louise Mary (2017.), Fold Forming for Jewellers and Metalsmiths, Ramsbury. ISBN 978-1785002724
- Jackson, Paul (2011.), Folding Techniques for Designers - from sheet to form, London
- Mitani, Jun (2019.) Curved Folding Origami Design, Broken Sound Parkway
