= Chrysoula Tsogka =

American applied mathematician

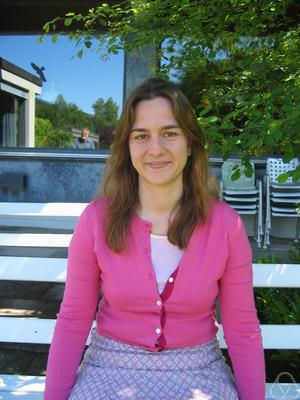
Tsogka at Oberwolfach in 2006

Chrysoula Tsogka is a Greek applied mathematician whose research involves remote sensing, wave propagation, and imaging through complex media. She is a professor of applied mathematics at the University of California, Merced.

== Education ==
Tsogka studied chemical engineering at the National Technical University of Athens, graduating with a bachelor's degree in 1995. She went to Paris Dauphine University for graduate study in applied mathematics, earning a master's degree in 1996 and completing her Ph.D. in 1999. Her dissertation, Mathematical and Numerical Modeling of 3D Elastic Wave Propagation in Complex Media with Cracks, was supervised by Patrick Joly.

== Career ==
After working as a researcher for CNRS in the Laboratoire de Mecanique et d’Acoustique, and as a visiting researcher at Stanford University, she became an assistant professor at the University of Chicago in 2004. She moved to the University of Crete as an associate professor in 2007, and was promoted to full professor in 2014. She took her present position at the University of California, Merced in 2019.
