= Mesa Union School District =

School district in Ventura County, California

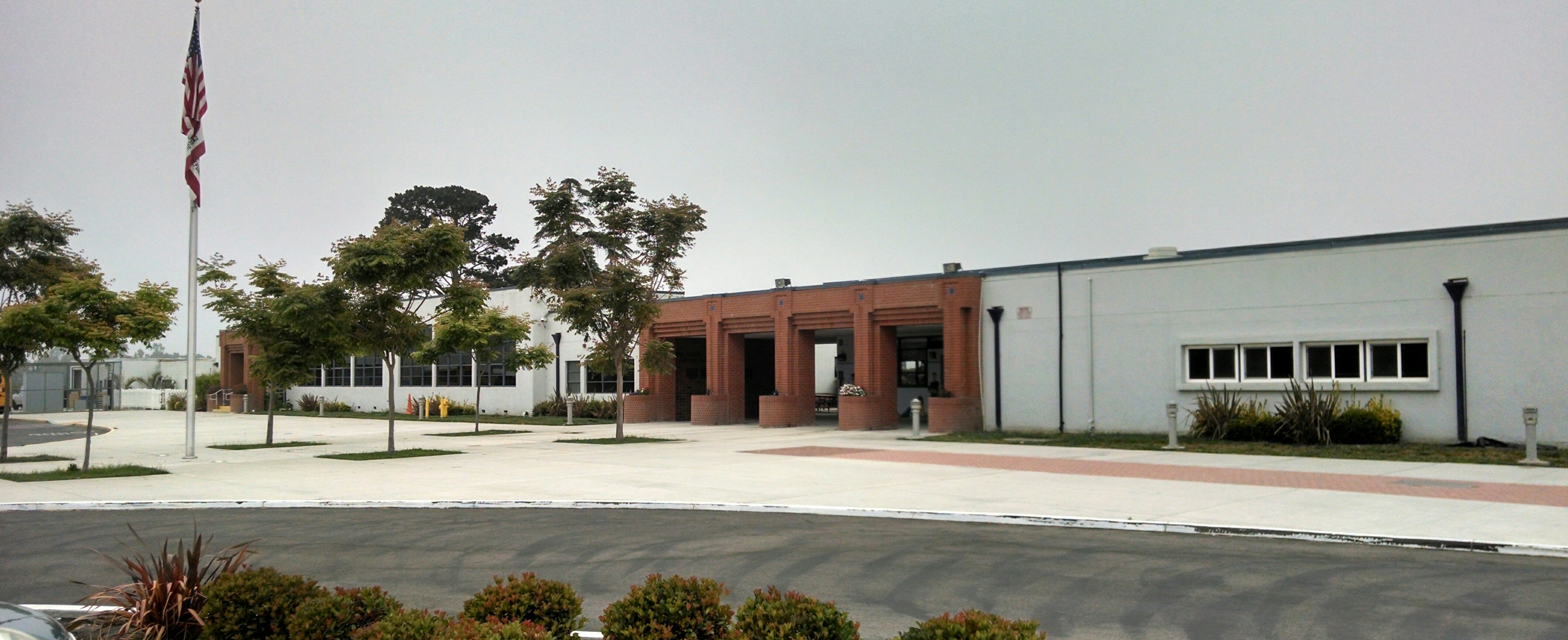
- Main Building was completed in 1939 by Federal Works Agency

Address
- 3901 North Mesa School Road Somis, California, 93066; United States
- Coordinates: 34°15′44″N 119°5′40″W

District information
- Type: Public
- Grades: K–12
- Established: 1937; 89 years ago
- NCES District ID: 0624720

Students and staff
- Students: 584 (2020–2021)
- Teachers: 27.24 (FTE)
- Staff: 27.1 (FTE)
- Student–teacher ratio: 21.44:1

Other information
- Website: www.mesaschool.org

Mesa Union Elementary School District is a public school district based in Ventura County, California, United States located on State Route 118. Many Mesa students attend Rio Mesa High School of the Oxnard Union High School District after completing 8th grade.

The Del Norte School District, that eventually merged with Center School District, may have been formed in the 1890s and had a one-room schoolhouse on Los Angeles Avenue (now SR 118) near Santa Clara Avenue.
