= Tanya Golash-Boza =

American sociologist and academic administrator

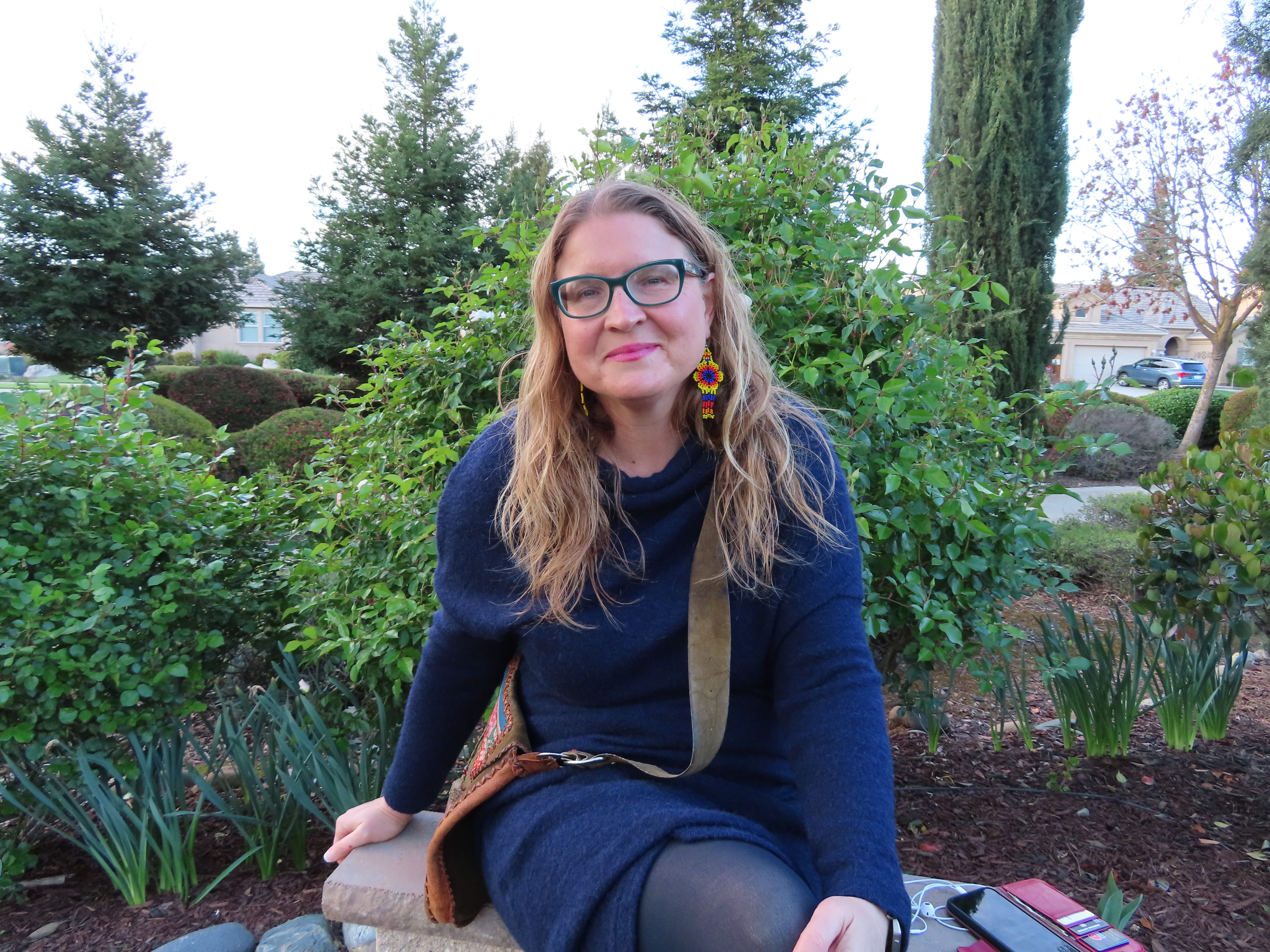
Tanya Golash-Boza

Tanya Golash-Boza is an American sociologist and academic administrator whose research focuses on race, immigration, and social inequality, particularly deportation, racial capitalism, and urban inequality. She is the executive director of the University of California Washington Center. She is also a professor of sociology at the University of California, Merced. She previously served as vice president of the Eastern Sociological Society.

== Education ==
Golash-Boza earned a B.A. in philosophy from the University of Maryland, College Park, a Certificate of Anthropology from the École d'Anthropologie in Paris in 1996, and a Ph.D. in sociology from the University of North Carolina at Chapel Hill in 2005.

== Selected books ==
Golash-Boza is the author of books on race, immigration, and social inequality.

- Before Gentrification: The Creation of D.C.'s Racial Wealth Gap (2023), University of California Press. ISBN 9780520391178.
- Race and Racisms: A Critical Approach (2015), Oxford University Press. ISBN 978-0199920013.
- Deported: Immigrant Policing, Disposable Labor, and Global Capitalism (2015), New York University Press. ISBN 978-1479843978.
- Immigration Nation: Raids, Detentions, and Deportations in Post-9/11 America (2011), Paradigm Publishers. ISBN 978-1594518386.
- Due Process Denied: Detentions and Deportations in the United States (2012), Routledge. ISBN 978-0415509305.
- Yo Soy Negro: Blackness in Peru (2012), University Press of Florida. ISBN 9780813044491.

== Research and contributions ==
Golash-Boza's research examines the relationships among race, immigration, capitalism, and inequality. Her early work focused on Blackness, racial identity, and racial inequality in Peru. Her subsequent research analyzed immigration enforcement, detention, and deportation in the United States, including the connections between immigrant policing, labor markets, and global capitalism. These themes are developed in Immigration Nation: Raids, Detentions, and Deportations in Post-9/11 America (2011) and Deported: Immigrant Policing, Disposable Labor, and Global Capitalism (2015).

Her later work has examined the historical production of racial wealth inequality and urban change in Washington, D.C. In Before Gentrification: The Creation of D.C.'s Racial Wealth Gap (2023), she connected redlining, racialized disinvestment, incarceration, policing, and gentrification to the loss of Black wealth and the displacement of Black communities in the city.

=== Firearm violence ===
Golash-Boza and sociologist Whitney Pirtle have developed a racial capitalism framework for understanding firearm violence in the United States. In a 2026 article, they examined why firearm violence remains persistent and unequally distributed despite evidence that firearm regulation, targeted policing, and community-based interventions can reduce harm. Drawing on a structured database of 395 citations, they situated research on segregation, economic precarity, illicit markets, firearm availability, policing, and community intervention within broader processes of accumulation, extraction, and profit.

The authors argue that labor-market exclusion, housing extraction, informal economies, firearm production and circulation, and state responses to violence collectively produce conditions in which firearm violence becomes more likely and more lethal. Their framework treats firearm violence not only as a consequence of inequality but also as an outcome of political-economic systems that make insecurity profitable while concentrating harm in racially marginalized communities. They argue that the framework extends public health research by directing attention to the political-economic arrangements that reproduce firearm violence.

== Honors and awards ==
Golash-Boza has received awards for her research, teaching, and public scholarship. She received the Distinguished Early Career Award from the Section on Racial and Ethnic Minorities of the American Sociological Association in 2010. In 2013, she received the University of California, Merced Senate Faculty Award for Distinguished Scholarly Public Service. In 2018, she received UC Merced's Excellence in Faculty Mentorship Award. Her book Before Gentrification: The Creation of D.C.'s Racial Wealth Gap received the 2024 Outstanding Book Award from the Community and Urban Sociology Section of the American Sociological Association.
