= Jessica L. Blois =

American paleoecologist

Academic background
- Education: BS, 2000, University of California, San Diego; MA, Humboldt State University; Ph.D. 2009, Stanford University
- Thesis: Ecological responses to paleoclimatic change: insights from mammalian population, specimens, and communities (2009)
- Website: jessicablois.com

Jessica Lynn Blois is an American paleoecologist.

== Early life and education ==
Blois attended Rio Mesa High School, where she graduated with a GPA of 4.67 and was named valedictorian. She was also the recipient of a National Merit Scholarship. From there, Blois attended the University of California, San Diego for her Bachelor of Science degree before moving to Arcata, California to attend Humboldt State University. She completed her education at Stanford University in 2009.

== Career ==
Blois worked as a postdoctoral research associate at the University of Wisconsin–Madison before moving to a faculty position at the University of California, Merced (UC Merced) in January 2013. In her first semester at the university, Blois published Space can substitute for time in predicting climate-change effects on biodiversity in the journal Proceedings of the National Academy of Sciences of the United States of America. In the study, researchers looked at the influence of climate on changes in plant communities across space to figure out whether climate had the same influence on plant communities across space and through time.

During her early tenure at the school, Blois cautioned humans had distributed ecosystems by looked at 359,896 unique pairs of plants and animals at 80 sites. Her studies results suggested that "the rules governing the assembly of communities have recently been changed by human activity." Using a grant from the National Science Foundation, Blois, Justin Yeakel, Jacquelyn Gill, and Luis M. Chiappe examined ancient asphalt “seeps” that had become fossilized at the Los Angeles County Museum of Art. Throughout her research, she has incorporated a multi-facet approach to studying climate-species interactions and biodiversity dynamics including using modern and ancient DNA. In recognition of her work, she was the recipient of the International Biogeography Society’s MacArthur & Wilson Award. She was also appointed subject editor of the journal Ecography.

In 2018, Blois became the UC Merced's 19th recipient of the National Science Foundation Faculty Early Career Development Program award. Upon receiving $782,449 over the next five years, she planned to study how species respond to climate change. She was also named Faculty Director of UC Merced's Natural Reserves, where she would be responsible for the upkeep of the Vernal Pools and Grassland Reserve and raising funds for a field station to be constructed on the Merced Vernal Pools and Grassland Reserve.
