= Martin Hagger =

British-born Australian health psychologist

- Born: Martin S. Hagger; 14 November 1972 (age 53); Kendal, Westmorland, England
- Education: Loughborough University; Open University; University of Jyväskylä
- Occupation: Health psychologist

Martin S. Hagger (born 14 November 1972) is a British-born Australian health psychologist. He is a distinguished professor in the department of psychological sciences at the University of California, Merced. He previously was a professor in the department of health psychology at the University of Jyväskylä.
