= Sarah Depaoli =

American psychologist

- Occupation: Academic

Academic background
- Education: University of Wisconsin, Madison (PhD); California State University, Sacramento (M.A., B.A.)

Academic work
- Discipline: Quantitative psychology
- Institutions: University of California, Merced

Sarah Depaoli is an American quantitative psychologist whose research is focused on Bayesian statistics and structural equation modeling. She is a professor of Psychological Sciences at the University of California, Merced, and serves as a visiting distinguished professor at the University of Tübingen's Methods Center in Germany.

== Recognition and honors ==
In 2015, Depaoli received the Rising Star (Early Career) Award from the Association for Psychological Science.

In 2016, she was elected as a member of the Society of Multivariate Experimental Psychology.

== Selected publications ==
- Depaoli, S. (2021). Bayesian Structural Equation Modeling. Guilford Press. ISBN 978-1462547746
