= Fictive behavior =

Process for physiological experiments

In fictive behavior, researchers silence an organism's sensory input and/or motor output for physiological experiments.

== Processes ==
A fictive preparation of the nervous system is achieved by surgical removal or chemical fixation, to observe behavior in response to experimental stimuli. Fixation allows for observation of target areas without interference from undesired neural signals or behavioral movement, which leads to more precise data collection. However, fictive behavior does not entirely resemble in vivo behavior because the true system has been altered. In some cases, surgery or measurement devices lessen the intensity of cellular signals. The goal of measuring localized behavior is to discover and or understand the circuitry further. The type of neural circuitry that is most commonly observed with fictive behavior are those that underlie rhythmic-behavior patterns.

Here is an example of how fictive feeding behavior is observed in a great pond snail (Lymnaea stagnalis). The lip and tentacle areas are bisected and isolated, by removing all other peripheral nerves, but the lip/tentacle and buccal nerves remain connected to the cerebral ganglia. Now establishing the buccal nerve pathway as the only way for signals to pass back and forth to the cerebral ganglia, sucrose (the food stimuli) is introduced to the lip and tentacle areas while intracellular recordings are taken simultaneously. The recordings take place in a saline solution that keeps the system viable for the duration of the experiment.
