= Fictive motion =

Fictive motion is the metaphorical motion of an object or abstraction through space. Fictive motion has become a subject of study in psycholinguistics and cognitive linguistics. In fictive motion sentences, a motion verb applies to a subject that is not literally capable of movement in the physical world, as in the sentence, "The fence runs along the perimeter of the house." Fictive motion is so called because it is attributed to material states, objects, or abstract concepts, that cannot (sensibly) be said to move themselves through physical space. Fictive motion sentences are pervasive in English and other languages.

== History ==
Cognitive linguist Leonard Talmy discussed many of the spatial and linguistic properties of fictive motion in a book chapter called "Fictive motion in language and 'ception'" (Talmy 1996). He provided further insights in his seminal book, Toward a Cognitive Semantics Vol. 1, in 2000. Talmy began analyzing the semantics of fictive motion in the late 1970s and early 1980s but used the term "virtual motion" at that time (e.g. Talmy 1983).

Fictive motion has since been investigated by cognitive scientists interested in whether and how it evokes dynamic imagery. Methods of investigation have included reading tasks, eye-tracking tasks and drawing tasks.

== Influence on perception of time ==
A recent avenue of research has focused on fictive motion's influence on perceptions of time. People often speak about time in terms of motion. English speakers may describe themselves as moving through time toward or past events with statements such as "we're entering the holidays" or "we slipped past the due date." They may also talk about events as moving toward or past themselves with statements such as "tough times are approaching us" or "summer vacation has passed". Broadly speaking, metaphorical talk about time borrows from two different perspectives for conceptualizing motion. In the ego-moving metaphor, one progresses along a timeline toward the future, while in the time-moving metaphor, a timeline is conceived as a conveyor belt upon which events move from the future to the past like packages. (e.g. Lakoff 1987).

It appears that not only does thinking about actual motion influence people's judgments about time, but thinking about fictive motion has the same effect, suggesting that thinking about one abstract domain may influence people's understanding of another. This raises the question of whether the influence of fictive motion on people's understanding of time is rooted in a concrete, embodied conception of motion, such that both time and fictive motion are ultimately understood in terms of simulations of concrete experience, or whether the effects of fictive motion are a product of the way that language influences thought.
