= Marjorie Zatz =

American sociologist (born 1955)

- Marjorie Sue Zatz
- Born: December 19, 1955 (age 69)
- Education: University of Massachusetts, Amherst (B.A., 1977), Indiana University Bloomington (M.A., 1979; Ph.D., 1982)
- Known for: Research on immigration and crime
- Awards: 2012 Fulbright Senior Specialist Award, American Society of Criminology's Herbert Block Award
- Scientific career
- Fields: Sociology, criminology
- Institutions: University of California, Merced, Arizona State University
- Thesis: Differential injustice: conflict theory extended (1982)

Marjorie Sue Zatz (born December 19, 1955) is an American sociologist and Professor Emerita of sociology at the University of California, Merced, where she also was the Vice Provost and Graduate Dean.

== Education and career ==
Zatz received her B.A. from the University of Massachusetts, Amherst in 1977, where she majored in sociology and minored in Latin American studies. She received her M.A. and Ph.D. in sociology from Indiana University Bloomington in 1979 and 1982, respectively. Her Ph.D. minor was Latin American studies. She joined the faculty of Arizona State University in 1982 as an assistant professor. On July 16, 2012, she began working at the National Science Foundation as the director of their Law and Social Sciences program. In 2014, she left the National Science Foundation and Arizona State University to join the University of California, Merced faculty. She became Professor Emerita from Merced on July 1, 2025.
