= Curtis Marsh =

Curtis Marsh may refer to:

- Curtis Marsh Sr. (born 1970), American football wide receiver for the Jacksonville Jaguars, Pittsburgh Steelers, and Saskatchewan Roughriders, father of the latter
- Curtis Marsh Jr. (born 1988), American football cornerback for the Philadelphia Eagles, son of the former
- Curtis Marsh (boxer) from Herol Graham
