= Howard A. Tullman =

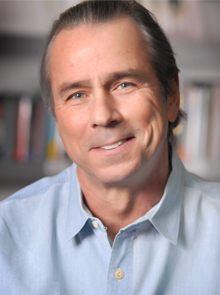
- Born: June 27, 1945 (age 81); St. Louis, Missouri
- Occupations: G2T3V, LLC, Managing Partner; Chicago High Tech Investment Partners, Managing Partner; former Executive Director, Kaplan Institute at Illinois Tech, 1871, former CEO

Howard A. Tullman is an American venture capitalist, educator, writer, lecturer, and art collector. He is the former executive director of the Ed Kaplan Family Institute for Innovation and Tech Entrepreneurship at Illinois Tech in Chicago and the first University Professor appointed at IIT. He is the former CEO of 1871, the current General Managing Partner of G2T3V, LLC, and is the current General Managing Partner of Chicago High Tech Investment Partners LLC, both early stage venture capital funds based in Chicago.

== Early life ==
Born in St. Louis, Missouri in 1945, Tullman was raised in a family of eight. He is the son of an apparel salesman and a stay-at-home mother (who later ran for public office in New Jersey) and the eldest of six siblings.

Tullman and his family moved to Highland Park, Illinois in 1961. Tullman graduated from Highland Park High School in 1963.

== Education ==
Tullman attended Northwestern University, graduating cum laude in 1967 with a B.A. in Mathematics and Economics. He received a J.D. from Northwestern's School of Law where he graduated with Honors in 1970. During his time at Northwestern, Tullman was elected to the Order of the Coif and served as the Chairman of the Editors of the Law Review. He was selected as a Ford Foundation Fellow and developed, along with James R. Thompson, former Governor of Illinois, a national Ford Foundation program for the study of criminal law. Tullman practiced law from the time he was admitted to the Bar in 1970 until 1980, specializing in large-scale class action cases and Chapter 11 bankruptcy reorganization cases. In 1974, he was admitted on special petition to the Bar of the United States Supreme Court. He retired from law to found CCC Information Services.

== Entrepreneurial career ==
As of August 2025, Tullman has started 12 companies, including Tribeca Flashpoint Media Arts Academy, CCC Information Services, Tunes.com, the Rolling Stone Network, Imagination Pilots, Experiencia, Original Research II, Eager Enterprises, G2T3V, LLC and others. Tullman has held senior executive positions at Coin Inc., Worldwide Xceed, and Kendall College, which he moved it from Evanston to a new facility on Goose Island in Chicago.

=== Positions held ===
- General Managing Partner, G2T3V, LLC in Chicago.
- Executive Director and University Professor, Ed Kaplan Family Institute for Innovation and Entrepreneurship, Illinois Tech
- CEO, 1871, the Number 1 ranked University-Affiliated Tech Incubator in the World
- President and CEO, Tribeca Flashpoint Media Arts Academy
- Chairman and CEO, Experiencia
- President, Kendall College
- CEO, Worldwide Xceed Group, Inc., a public Chicago-based provider of digital strategy and Internet design services
- Managing Partner, Hyper>Box, LLC
- CEO, JAMtv and Tunes.com, an early provider of online digital music and other resources and the developer under his guidance and direction of Rollingstone.com, DownbeatJazz.com and The Source.com
- CEO, Imagination Pilots, Inc., a multimedia software developer specializing in CD-ROM games and entertainment products for the PC and Macintosh
- CEO, Eager Enterprises, Inc., a privately held information industry venture capital firm which he founded in Chicago
- Chairman, Financial Protection Services, a privately held corporation providing computerized information to businesses and consumers
- Founder and CEO, CCC Information Services Inc. a Software as a Service provider to the automotive, insurance, and collision repair industries, now a public company
- CEO, Information Kinetics, Inc. and Career Network, which developed and marketed a national computerized database of job candidates
- CEO, COIN, Inc., a provider of automotive information, communication channels, and information management systems to the automotive industry and to related credit and financial industries
- Co-founder, Monumental Art and Events, Inc., an event marketing organization
- CEO, Original Research II, a customer satisfaction measurement and management company
- Chairman of the Board and Lead Director of The Cobalt Group in Seattle and The Princeton Review in New York

=== 1871 Chicago ===
In January 2014, Tullman became CEO of 1871, a non-profit startup hub located in The Merchandise Mart in Chicago and of its parent, the Chicagoland Entrepreneurial Center (CEC). 1871 was founded in May 2012 and is home to over 495 digital startups.

Tullman helped establish The Bunker, a veteran-run startup incubator.

== Written works ==
Tullman has written, lectured and been interviewed on a number of legal and career issues. He has contributed chapters to several books, including Life After Law and Innovating Chicago Style. He wrote the preface for You Need to be a Little Crazy by Barry Moltz, and his business ventures are included in Robert Jordan's book How They Did It.

Tullman has written over 450 weekly columns which have appeared for 12 years on Inc. Magazine's website, Inc.com. The 450 plus articles published on Inc.com served as the foundation for Tullman's 24-book series, The Perspiration Principles as well as his two later books entitled You Can't Win a Race with Your Mouth and Words of Wisdom. He is the author of HindSight, a newsletter on current topics of interest to entrepreneurs and managers.

== Howard A. and Judith Tullman art collection ==
The Howard A. and Judith Tullman art collection is among the largest and most diverse collections of contemporary realist art in America. The collection contains upwards of 1,300 pieces, more than 250 of which previously lined the halls of Tribeca Flashpoint Media Arts Academy and are now displayed in Tullman private gallery and studio in Chicago.

In addition to being an active collector, Tullman has lent and donated art from the Tullman Collection to museums including:

- Mary and Leigh Block Museum of Art
- Smart Museum of Art of the University of Chicago
- Art Institute of Chicago
- Chicago Children's Museum
- Evanston Art Center
- The Springfield Art Museum
- Milwaukee Art Museum
- Madison Museum of Contemporary Art
- The Arnot Museum
- Frye Museum
- Mobile Museum of Art
- The Museum of the South
- Museum of Contemporary Art, Chicago

Tullman has worked closely with various artists and created a limited edition work of art in collaboration with the internationally known artist, Christo, which was used as a fundraising project for the Museum of Contemporary Art, where he previously served as a Trustee. The Tullman Collection has been featured in numerous catalogs including a major publication Creative Imaginings of 61 paintings from the Collection by the Mobile Museum of Art.

== Works ==
- Altman, Mary Ann (1991). Life After Law: Second Careers for Lawyers. W. Smith Co. ISBN 978-0963061003.
- Kuczmarski, Thomas D.; Dan Miller and Luke Tanen (2012). Innovating Chicago Style: How Local Innovators are Building the National Economy. Chicago: Book Ends Publisher. pp. 74–75. ISBN 978-0-615-54885-2.
- Moltz, Barry (2008). You Need To Be a Little Crazy. Chicago: AuthorHouse. pp. xiii. ISBN 978-1438921907.
- Jordan, Robert (2010). How They Did It: Billion Dollar Insights from the Heart of America. Chicago: RedFlash Press. pp. 152–156. ISBN 978-0615385433.
- Tullman, Howard A. (2012). The Perspiration Principles Volume I. CreateSpace Independent Publishing Platform. ISBN 978-1479250424.
- Tullman, Howard A. (2012). The Perspiration Principles Volume II. CreateSpace Independent Publishing Platform. ISBN 1479265411.
- Tullman, Howard A. (2012). The Perspiration Principles Volume III. CreateSpace Independent Publishing Platform. ISBN 148396597X.
- Tullman, Howard A. (2013). The Perspiration Principles Volume IV. CreateSpace Independent Publishing Platform. ISBN 149093376X.
- Tullman, Howard A. (2013). The Perspiration Principles Volume V. CreateSpace Independent Publishing Platform. ISBN 1492233137.
- Tullman, Howard A. (2014). The Perspiration Principles Volume VI. CreateSpace Independent Publishing Platform. ISBN 1494911515.
- Tullman, Howard A. (2014). The Perspiration Principles Volume VII. CreateSpace Independent Publishing Platform. ISBN 1499661207.
- Tullman, Howard A. (2014). The Perspiration Principles Volume VIII. CreateSpace Independent Publishing Platform. ISBN 1499674155.
- Tullman, Howard A. (2014). The Perspiration Principles Volume IX. CreateSpace Independent Publishing Platform. ISBN 1503253988.
- Tullman, Howard A. (2014). The Perspiration Principles Volume X. CreateSpace Independent Publishing Platform. ISBN 1503253988.
- Tullman, Howard A. (2014). The Perspiration Principles Volume XI. CreateSpace Independent Publishing Platform. ISBN 1619849941
- Tullman, Howard A. (2014). The Perspiration Principles Volume XII. BlogIntoBook.com. ISBN 1619849852.
- Tullman, Howard A. (2015). The Perspiration Principles Volume XIII. BlogIntoBook.com. ISBN 1619849860.
- Tullman, Howard A. (2015). The Perspiration Principles Volume XIV. BlogIntoBook.com. ISBN 1619849879.
- Tullman, Howard A. (2015). The Perspiration Principles Volume XV. BlogIntoBook.com. ISBN 1619849887.
- Tullman, Howard A. (2015). The Perspiration Principles Volume XVI. BlogIntoBook.com. ISBN 1619849720.
- Tullman, Howard A. (2016). The Perspiration Principles Volume XVII. BlogIntoBook.com. ISBN 1619849739.
- Tullman, Howard A. (2016). The Perspiration Principles Volume XVIII. BlogIntoBook.com. ISBN 1619849747.
- Tullman, Howard A. (2016). The Perspiration Principles Volume XIX. BlogIntoBook.com. ISBN 1619849755 .
- Tullman, Howard A. (2016). The Perspiration Principles Volume XX. BlogIntoBook.com. ISBN 1540785610.
- Tullman, Howard A. (2017). The Perspiration Principles Volume XXI. BlogIntoBook.com. ISBN 1976044081.
- Tullman, Howard A. (2017). The Perspiration Principles Volume XXII. BlogIntoBook.com. ISBN 1979357730.
- Tullman, Howard A. (2017). The Perspiration Principles Volume XXIII. BlogIntoBook.com. ISBN 1981402888.
- Tullman, Howard A. (2018). The Perspiration Principles Volume XXIV. BlogIntoBook.com. ISBN 1984962906.
- Tullman, Howard A. (2014). Tullman on Company Culture: How to Build & Grow a Successful Business. BlogIntoBook.com. ISBN 1619849992.
- Tullman, Howard A. (2015). Fundraising in the Digital Age: You Get What You Work For, Not What You Wish For. BlogIntoBook.com. ISBN 161984978X.
- Tullman, Howard A. (2015). Launching a Startup in the Digital Age: You Get What You Work For, Not What You Wish For. BlogIntoBook.com. ISBN 1619849844.
- Tullman, Howard A. (2016). Sales & Marketing in the Digital Age: You Get What You Work For, Not What You Wish For. BlogIntoBook.com. ISBN 1619849828.
- Tullman, Howard A. (2016). Customer Acquisition & Retention in the Digital Age: You Get What You Work For, Not What You Wish For. BlogIntoBook.com. ISBN 1619849836.
- Tullman, Howard A. (2016). Growing a Startup in the Digital Age: You Get What You Work For, Not What You Wish for. BlogIntoBook.com. ISBN 161984981X.
- Tullman, Howard A. (2017). Managing a Startup in the Digital Age: You Get What You Work For, Not What You Wish For. BlogIntoBook.com. ISBN 1619849771.
- Tullman, Howard A. (2017). The Perspiration Principles - Education Edition: You Get What You Work For, Not What You Wish For. BlogIntoBook.com. ISBN 1619849100.
- Tullman, Howard A. (2019). You Can't Win A Race With Your Mouth. BlogIntoBook.com. ISBN 1642373257.
