= Cameo (website) =

American video-sharing website

- Website type: Entertainment
- Headquarters: Chicago, Illinois, United States
- Owners: Steven Galanis; Martin Blencowe; Devon Spinnler Townsend
- Employees: 33 (2023)
- Website: cameo.com
- Launched: March 15, 2017; 9 years ago

Cameo is an American video-sharing website headquartered in Chicago, Illinois. Created in 2016 by Steven Galanis, Martin Blencowe, and Devon Spinnler Townsend, and launched in March 2017, the site allows fans to send some basic information to celebrities, who then use that to send personalized video messages to fans' friends, loved ones, or to the fans themselves. By May 2020, more than 30,000 celebrities had joined the platform. The company peaked at 400 employees during the COVID-19 pandemic in the United States, when social distancing during 2020 and 2021 made the service a convenient way to send unique best wishes to friends and family; by July 2023, staff had fallen to 33 people.

== Overview ==
Steven Galanis and Martin Blencowe conceived Cameo in 2016, after leaving Galanis's grandmother's funeral. Blencowe's work included being a film producer and NFL agent. In April 2016, Blencowe got NFL player Cassius Marsh to record himself congratulating his friend on the birth of his son. The duo realized that "the selfie was the new autograph".

On March 15, 2017, Marsh tweeted a photo introducing his fans to the launch of the site. Celebrities with more than 20,000 Instagram followers are eligible to set up an account with Cameo. In 2018, Galanis said Cameo had implemented a content moderation system to detect terms flagged by the Southern Poverty Law Center.

In 2020, Forbes ranked Cameo at No. 19 on its list of America's 500 Best Startup Employers, falling to No. 49 in 2021, and it was no longer on that list by 2023. In 2021, LinkedIn ranked Cameo at No. 17 on its list of 50 startups "where Americans want to work now", and it was no longer on that shorter (as compared to Forbes) list by 2022.

The site grew during the height of the COVID-19 pandemic in the United States (c. 2020 – c. 2021), as it accommodated social distance restrictions, for both clients and celebrities, in place in during that time. By May 2020, more than 30,000 celebrities had joined the platform.

In July 2020 the site launched Promotional Cameos, a premium priced service for businesses to buy celebrity endorsements.

In May 2019, an article in Axios estimated a US$300 million (equivalent to $362 million in 2024) valuation for Cameo; in 2021, the SoftBank Vision Fund estimated a valuation for Cameo of US$1 billion (equivalent to $1.1 billion in 2024). and the company increased its staff from 100 to 400 during the pandemic. Following the end of the pandemic, and the associated inflation that led to interest rate hikes, Cameo went through a series of layoffs: it cut 87 people in May 2022; a further 80 people in November 2022; and performed a third round of layoffs in July 2023, bringing their number of employees down to 33. The SoftBank Vision Fund reduced the valuation estimate to $100 million in 2022, and Cameo's own investors estimating that the valuation had fallen to $50 million by 2023.

Popularity resurged due to the 2023 SAG-AFTRA strike, with over 2,400 actors joining or rejoining the site, attracting more customers.

== Reception ==
In October 2018, Time magazine named Cameo as one of the "50 Most Genius Companies". In September 2019, Cameo received the Momentum Award, given annually by the digital startup incubator 1871. In December 2019, co-founder Townsend topped the "2020 Forbes 30 under 30: Consumer Technology" list.

In March 2020, Cameo appeared in two lists in Fast Company, topping its list of the "World's Most Innovative Social Media Companies" and appearing on its unranked list of the "World's 50 Most Innovative Companies". A May 2020 article in Chicago called Cameo "The Most American Startup Ever". That same month, Galanis was named one of "Hollywood's Top Innovators" by The Hollywood Reporter.

People noted for their use of Cameo include former US congressman George Santos. Cameo's CEO said that his launch was among the most successful.

== See also ==
- Patreon
- OnlyFans
- Convoz
