= Cassius Marsh =

American football player (born 1992)

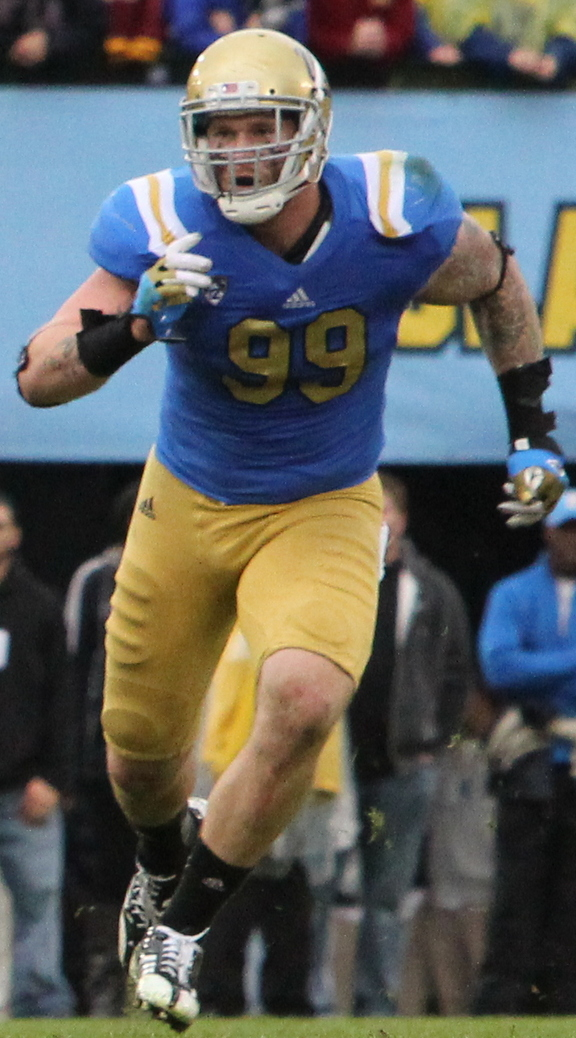
- Marsh with the UCLA Bruins in 2012

No. 91, 55, 54, 49, 59
- Position: Linebacker

Personal information
- Born: July 7, 1992 (age 34); Mission Hills, California, U.S.
- Listed height: 6 ft 4 in (1.93 m)
- Listed weight: 254 lb (115 kg)

Career information
- High school: Oaks Christian School (Westlake Village, California)
- College: UCLA (2010–2013)
- NFL draft: 2014: 4th round, 108th overall pick

Career history
- Seattle Seahawks (2014–2016); New England Patriots (2017); San Francisco 49ers (2017–2018); Seattle Seahawks (2019)*; Arizona Cardinals (2019); Jacksonville Jaguars (2020); Indianapolis Colts (2020); Pittsburgh Steelers (2020); Chicago Bears (2021)
- * Offseason or practice squad member only

Career NFL statistics
- Total tackles: 181
- Sacks: 15.0
- Forced fumbles: 5
- Fumble recoveries: 2
- Stats at Pro Football Reference

Cassius Lee Marsh Sr. (born July 7, 1992) is an American former professional football player who was a linebacker in the National Football League (NFL). He played college football for the UCLA Bruins, and was selected by the Seattle Seahawks in the fourth round of the 2014 NFL draft. He also played for the New England Patriots, San Francisco 49ers, Arizona Cardinals, Jacksonville Jaguars, Indianapolis Colts, Pittsburgh Steelers and Chicago Bears.

== Early life ==
Marsh attended Oaks Christian School in Westlake Village, California. He was a member of PrepStar Dream Team and Tacoma News-Tribune Western 100. He was ranked as 22nd defensive tackle prospect nationally by Tom Lemming/MaxPreps during high school. He was selected to the GoldenStatePreps.com All-State first-team and All-SoCal first-team. He was named CIF-SS All-Northwest Division co-Defensive Player of the Year in his junior season. He played in the U.S. Army All-America Game after high school. He recorded 83 tackles, 23 sacks, in his senior season at high school.

Rivals rated Marsh as a four-star prospect being the No. 4 defensive tackle, No. 6 prospect in the state of California, and the No. 33 prospect overall regardless of position. ESPN recruiting rated Marsh as a three-star prospect being the No. 33 defensive tackle, and the No. 33 prospect in the state of California. 247 rated Cassius as a four-star prospect being the No. 11 defensive tackle, and the No. 142 overall prospect (No. 114 composite ranking) regardless of position. Scout.com rated Cassius as a four-star prospect as well. Many major college programs offered scholarships and, after committing to LSU, Marsh changed his mind and committed to the University of California, Los Angeles, so he would be closer to home.

== College career ==
In December 2010, he was selected to the Rivals.com Pac-10 Conference All-Freshman team in his freshman season. He was winner of UCLA's John Boncheff Jr. Memorial Award for Rookie of the Year in his freshman season.

== Professional career ==
Pre-draft measurables
Height	Weight	Arm length	Hand span	Wingspan	40-yard dash	10-yard split	20-yard split	20-yard shuttle	Three-cone drill	Vertical jump	Broad jump	Bench press
6 ft 4 in (1.93 m)	252 lb (114 kg)	32 3/4 in (0.83 m)	9 1/2 in (0.24 m)	6 ft 6 in (1.98 m)	4.70 s	1.72 s	2.81 s	4.25 s	7.08 s	32 in (0.81 m)	9 ft 6 in (2.90 m)	14 reps
All values from NFL Combine/Pro Day

=== Seattle Seahawks (first stint) ===
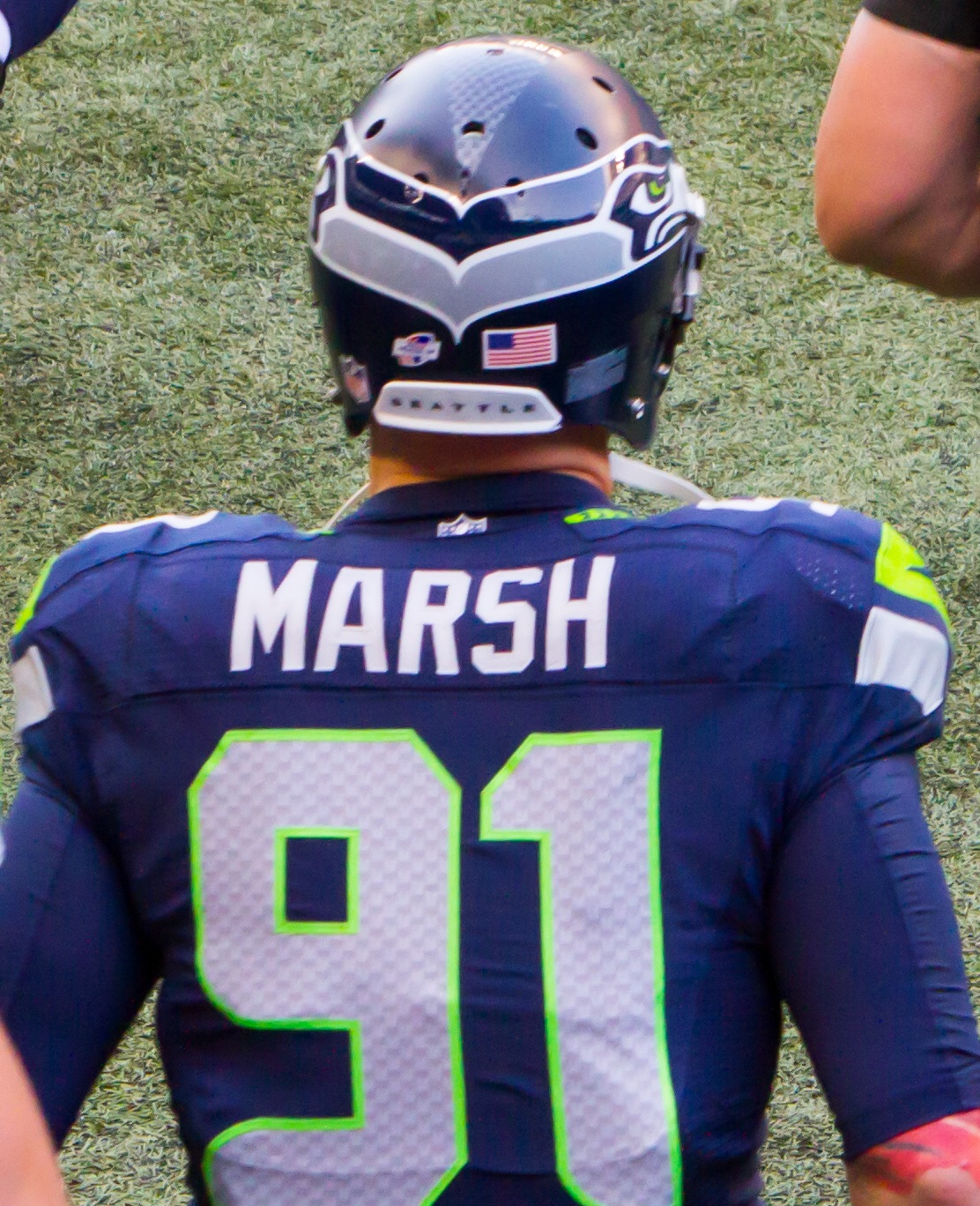
Marsh with the Seattle Seahawks in 2014

Marsh was selected by the Seattle Seahawks in the fourth round, 108th overall, of the 2014 NFL draft. He was signed to a four-year contract on May 19, 2014. In practice for Week 7 of his rookie season, Marsh broke a bone on the outside of his foot and was subsequently placed on season-ending injured reserve.

In their season opener of the 2016 season against the Miami Dolphins, Marsh recorded the first sack and first forced fumble of his NFL career. In Week 14, he made his first career fumble recovery in a 40–7 win over the Carolina Panthers. He finished the season appearing in all 16 regular season games and 1 start, recording 3.0 sacks.

=== New England Patriots ===
On September 2, 2017, the Seahawks traded Marsh to the New England Patriots in exchange for the Patriots' fifth (No. 168: Jamarco Jones) and seventh-round (No. 250: the Patriots were traded back the pick and selected Ryan Izzo) selections in the 2018 NFL draft. In Week 1 against the Kansas City Chiefs, his blown coverage resulted in a 78-yard Kareem Hunt touchdown reception. In Week 7, he blocked a field goal in the first quarter of a 23–7 win over the Atlanta Falcons. On November 21, two days following a Week 11 win over the Oakland Raiders in Mexico City, the Patriots waived Marsh. A report in 2018 said that Marsh had a locker room “tirade” and temper tantrum over his low amount of playing time at halftime while the Patriots led 17–0. He ended his time with New England contributing 1.0 sack and a forced fumble in nine games and one start.

=== San Francisco 49ers ===
Marsh was claimed off waivers by the San Francisco 49ers a day after being released by the Patriots. On February 7, 2018, Marsh signed a two-year contract extension with the 49ers.

In 2018, Marsh played in 16 games with three starts, recording a career-high 38 combined tackles and 5.5 sacks.

On March 15, 2019, Marsh was released by the 49ers.

=== Seattle Seahawks (second stint) ===
On April 4, 2019, Marsh signed with the Seattle Seahawks. He was released by the Seahawks on August 31.

=== Arizona Cardinals ===
On September 1, 2019, Marsh signed with the Arizona Cardinals.

=== Jacksonville Jaguars ===
Marsh signed with the Jacksonville Jaguars on April 6, 2020. He was released by the Jaguars on October 15.

=== Indianapolis Colts ===
On October 24, 2020, Marsh was signed to the practice squad of the Indianapolis Colts. He was elevated to the active roster on November 12, November 21, and November 28 for the team's Weeks 10, 11, and 12 games against the Tennessee Titans (twice) and Green Bay Packers, and reverted to the practice squad after each game.

=== Pittsburgh Steelers ===
On December 9, 2020, Marsh was signed by the Pittsburgh Steelers off the Colts' practice squad. He was placed on the reserve/COVID-19 list by the team on January 2, 2021, and activated five days later.

On March 24, 2021, Marsh was re-signed by the Steelers to a one-year contract. He was released by Pittsburgh on August 31.

=== Chicago Bears ===
On November 3, 2021, Marsh was signed to the Chicago Bears' practice squad. On November 19, Marsh was signed to the active roster. In his first game as a Bear, on Monday Night Football against the Steelers, Marsh sacked Ben Roethlisberger late to force fourth down and celebrated by doing a spinning jump kick before glancing at the Pittsburgh bench. Referee Tony Corrente penalized him for taunting. As Marsh returned to the Bears sideline, he collided with Corrente as the latter seemingly stepped backward into him. The penalty gave the Steelers a first down and allowed them to burn more time, eventually leading to a 29–27 win. Corrente defended the flag because Marsh "posture[d] in such a way that I felt he was taunting them", while Marsh insisted it was "just bad timing" and claimed Corrente hip checked him. The NFL subsequently fined him $5,972 for unsportsmanlike conduct.

He was placed on injured reserve on December 10.

=== Retirement ===
After not playing since 2021, Marsh formally announced his retirement on June 11, 2026. He signed a one-day contract with the Seahawks as the team with whom he began his career.

== Personal life ==
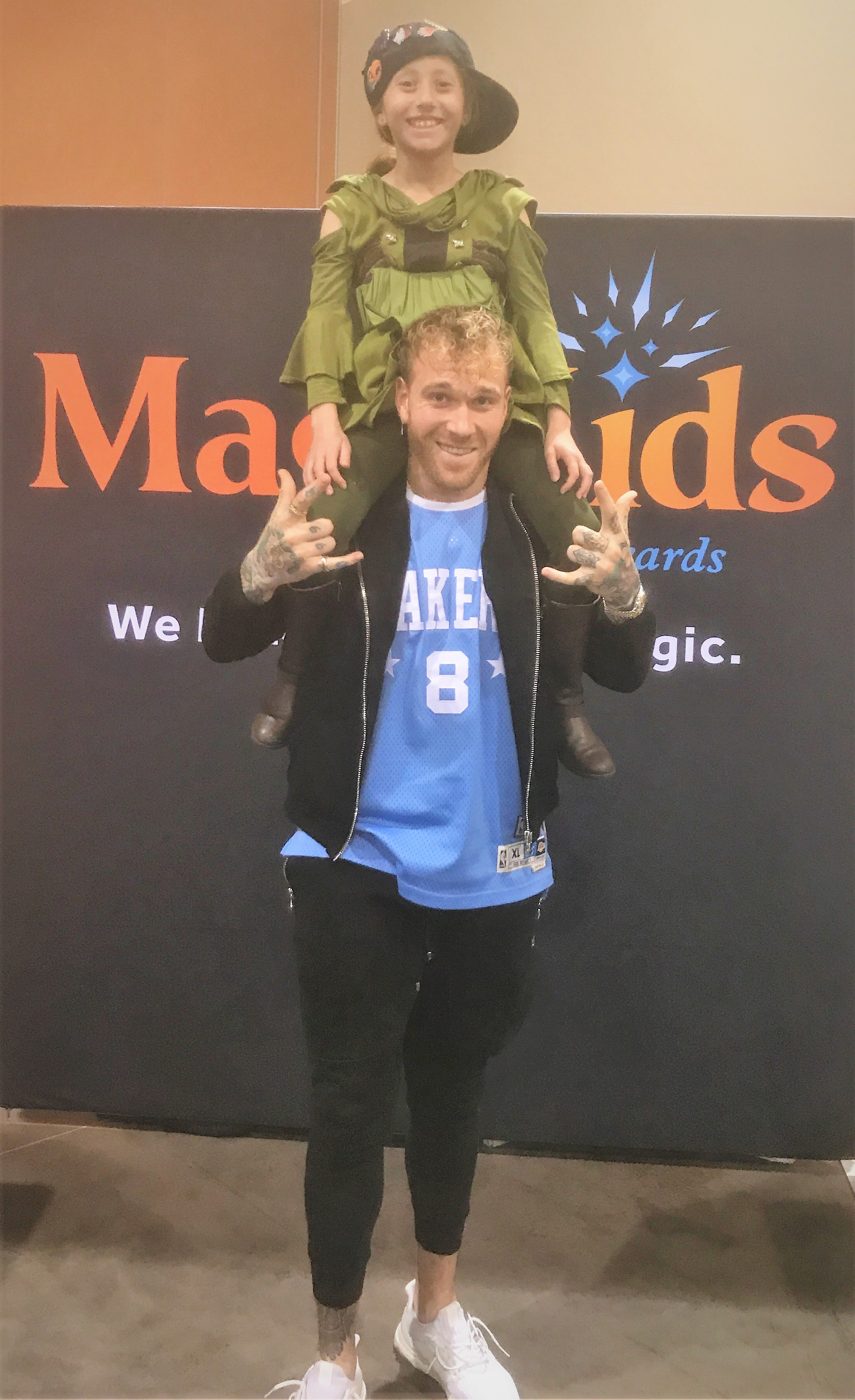
Marsh with young competitive Magic player Dana Fischer in early 2020

Marsh is the son of Curtis Marsh Sr. and the half-brother of Curtis Marsh Jr. Marsh's father, a wide receiver who played college football for the Utah Utes, was selected in the seventh round of the 1995 NFL draft by the Jacksonville Jaguars. Curtis Sr. played two seasons for the Jaguars and one for the Pittsburgh Steelers before going to the Canadian Football League, where he was an All-Star in 2000. Curtis Jr. played college football for the Utah State Aggies; he was a running back for the 2007 and 2008 seasons before moving to defensive back for the 2009 and 2010 seasons. Curtis Jr. was selected in the third round of the 2011 NFL draft by the Philadelphia Eagles.

Marsh is an avid Magic: The Gathering player and owns decks whose total value was more than $20,000. He also co-founded and co-owns the local game store Cash Cards Unlimited with his business partner Nick Nugwynne where he sells trading card game and hobby products.

Marsh was also one of the first investors in popular video gifting app Cameo.
