= 1871 (disambiguation) =

1871 is a year in the 19th century.

1871 may also refer to:

- 1871 (number), a number
- 1871 (film), a 1990 period film
- 1871 (company), a non-profit digital startup incubator
