= California College of ASU =

Private college in Los Angeles, California

- Former names: Columbia College Hollywood (until 2023)
- Type: Private college
- Active: 1953–December 19, 2025
- Dean and CEO: Alanka Brown
- Administrative staff: 47
- Students: 149
- Location: Los Angeles, California, United States
- Website: https://californiacollege.asu.edu/
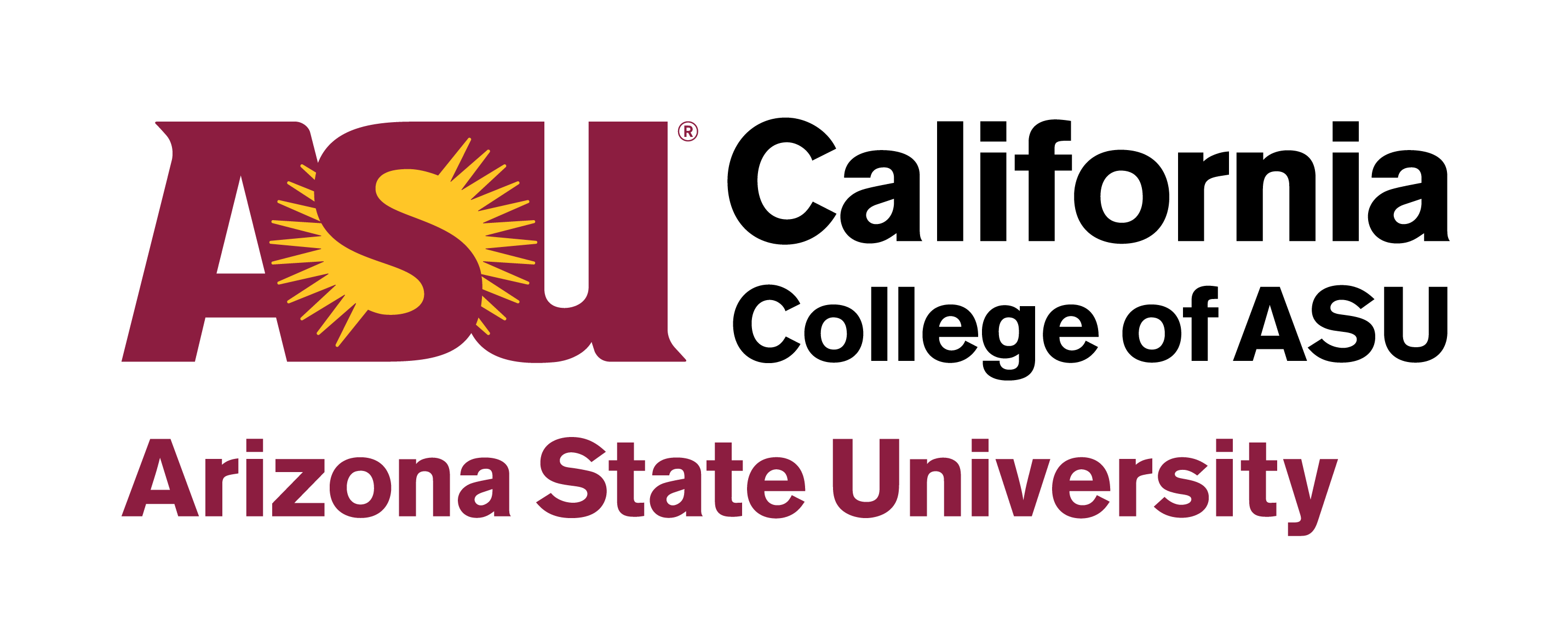

California College of ASU, known as Columbia College Hollywood until 2023, was a private college in Los Angeles, California, United States. Founded in 1953 as a branch campus of Columbia College Chicago, it offered a curriculum focused on the radio, television, and film industries. It was one of 20 film schools in the United States to be a full member of the International Association of Film and Television Schools (CILECT) and was accredited by the Western Association of Schools and Colleges Senior College and University Commission.

Columbia College Hollywood began in 1953 in the MacArthur Park neighborhood and moved to central Hollywood in 1970. From 1997 to 2023, it operated from the former headquarters of Panavision in the Tarzana neighborhood of Los Angeles. A branch campus in Chicago, Flashpoint Chicago, operated from 2018 to 2022. The institution—struggling with enrollment after the COVID-19 pandemic—became a private, independent, nonprofit affiliate of Arizona State University (ASU) in 2022 and moved its operations to the ASU California Center at the Herald Examiner Building in downtown Los Angeles. Under this arrangement, the renamed California College of ASU had its own board of trustees and degree programs. It closed on December 19, 2025, with its programming being absorbed by ASU.

== History ==
Columbia College Hollywood was founded in 1953 in the MacArthur Park neighborhood of Los Angeles as a division of Columbia College in Chicago. The curriculum focused on the growing television and radio industries. In 1959, Columbia College Hollywood separated from the Chicago institution to operate as an independent, private, non-profit college.

In its early years, Columbia College Hollywood grew alongside the film and television industries, eventually moving from MacArthur Park in 1970 to a larger space on La Brea Avenue in central Hollywood. The college established its current campus in 1997 when it moved into the former headquarters of Panavision in the Tarzana neighborhood of Los Angeles. At that time, its enrollment was 200. In 2018, Columbia College Hollywood acquired the former Tribeca Flashpoint College, a creative media school in Chicago, Illinois, which became Columbia College Hollywood's first branch campus, now named Flashpoint Chicago, a campus of Columbia College Hollywood. The Chicago campus closed in 2022.

Columbia College Hollywood struggled through the COVID-19 pandemic. In 2023, Columbia College Hollywood affiliated with Arizona State University and was renamed California College of ASU. Under this arrangement, the college had its own board of trustees and degree programs. Its operations moved from the Tarzana campus to the ASU California Center in downtown Los Angeles. California College of ASU closed on December 19, 2025. ASU is the custodian of records for the former institution.

== Tarzana campus ==
From 1997 to 2023, Columbia College Hollywood was located on a 85,000-square-foot (7,900 m^{2}) campus in the Tarzana neighborhood of Los Angeles, within the San Fernando Valley. One of the buildings was previously a camera assembly facility for Panavision. Located close to multiple studios, the facility featured a 96-seat 5.1-channel surround sound theater for screenings, classes, and events, a 35-seat 7.1-channel surround sound screening room, a sound stage, a three-camera high-definition television stage with a green screen and control room, a Foley/ADR suite with a sound-isolated booth and control room, post-production editing suites, standing sets, an acting studio, writers' rooms, traditional classrooms, and an equipment room with industry standard film, video, and sound equipment.

== Flashpoint Chicago ==
The Flashpoint Chicago campus occupied the fifth and sixths floors of the historic Burnham Center building at 28 North Clark Street in the downtown Chicago Loop.

Flashpoint's campus housed a 52-seat screening room, studio space for filmmaking and recording arts, sound design suites, animation and visual effects labs and an experiential design lab. The library and learning commons offered study space and print and digital resources.

Flashpoint's film sound stage was located on the campus of Cinespace Studios in Chicago. It was a professional light-and-sound-controlled 10,000-square-foot environment with a three-wall set, an elephant door for drive-up loading and unloading, a 32-foot ceiling height, soundproof padded walls and ceiling, and a leveled floor for track-free dollying.

2019 Flashpoint Chicago campus degree programs included Bachelor of Fine Arts in Cinema, Bachelor of Fine Arts in Graphic Design + Interactive Media, Bachelor of Fine Arts in Visual Effects, Associate of Fine Arts in Design + Visual Communication, Associate of Applied Science in Film, Associate of Applied Science in Recording Arts, and Associate of Fine Arts in Visual Effects + Animation. Online programs include Bachelor of Fine Arts in Graphic Design + Interactive Media, and Bachelor of Fine Arts in Visual Effects.

The campus and school closed in 2022.

== Academics ==
California College of ASU offered undergraduate degree programs focused on digital media arts, including film, graphic design, interactive media, visual effects, digital media production, and recording arts. Students also studied liberal arts and sciences, such as the humanities, communication, fine arts, mathematics, natural sciences, and social/behavioral sciences.

In 2019, Columbia College Hollywood from its Los Angeles campus offered Bachelor of Fine Arts programs in cinema, graphic design and interactive media, and visual effects, as well as an Associate of Arts in cinema. It offered online Bachelor of Fine Arts programs in visual effects and graphic design and interactive media. All Bachelor of Fine Arts degree students selected an emphasis area for their studies, including acting, cinematography, directing, digital marketing, and digital modeling.

== Faculty ==
As of 2019, the student-to-teacher ratio at Columbia College Hollywood was 12:1. Many of the college's instructors were working industry professionals who had won Emmys, Golden Globes, and Academy Awards. As of 2019, faculty had logged more than 150 feature films and 2,500 hours of television programming; collectively created more than two dozen TV series; and authored more than 2,000 articles and reviews in academic and other publications. The faculty also included members of entertainment industry associations including the Academy of Motion Picture Arts and Sciences, Academy of Television Arts & Sciences, and the British Academy of Film and Television Arts. CCH's adjunct general education faculty members had academic backgrounds in the humanities, natural and social sciences, technology, business, and art.

== Notable alumni ==
Columbia College Hollywood alumni have worked in all areas of the film industry, from hit television shows and blockbuster films to animated features and independent productions.

- Robert Schwentke, German film director
- Jaume Collet-Serra, Spanish film director
- Jerry Franck, Luxembourgish/American film producer and director
- Timothy Linh Bui, Vietnamese-born American writer, director, and producer
- Jay Jennings, American independent film director
- Eagle Egilsson, Icelandic television director and cinematographer
- Brent Morin, American comedian, actor, and writer
- Blaaze (real name Lakshmi Narasimha Vijaya Rajagopala Sheshadri Sharma Rajesh Raman), Tamil playback singer and rapper

== Memberships ==
The college was a member of:

- CILECT - International Association of Film and Television Schools
- University Film and Video Association (UFVA)
- National Association of Independent College and Universities (NAICU)
