= Flashpoint Chicago =

Former art school part of Columbia College Hollywood

Coordinates: 41°52′58″N 87°37′53″W

- Other names: Flashpoint
- Type: Private college satellite campus
- Active: 2007–2022
- Founders: Ric Landry
- President: Bill Smith
- Students: 565
- Location: Chicago, Illinois, U.S.
- Campus: Urban
- Website: flashpoint.columbiacollege.edu

Flashpoint Chicago was a campus of Columbia College Hollywood, a private liberal arts college with a focus on communication, media arts, and contemporary storytelling. Flashpoint Chicago was located in downtown Chicago, Illinois. It closed at the end of the 2021–2022 academic year.

The campus was accredited by the WASC Senior College and University Commission (WSCUC) to offer Bachelor of Fine Arts and associate degree programs.

== History ==
In 2018, Flashpoint Chicago became a branch campus of Columbia College Hollywood, a private, regionally accredited non-profit institution, after the college acquired the former Tribeca Flashpoint College in Chicago, Illinois.

Flashpoint Chicago was originally founded in 2007 as Flashpoint, The Academy of Media Arts and Sciences. In 2010, the college entered a partnership with Tribeca Enterprises, the company established by Robert De Niro, Jane Rosenthal and Craig Hatkoff best known for producing the Tribeca Film Festival, and the college was renamed Tribeca Flashpoint Media Arts Academy. Sterling Capital Partners, a private equity firm, became the majority owner of Tribeca Flashpoint Academy in 2012, and in April 2015, the school announced that it had become Tribeca Flashpoint College. Flashpoint has since ended its association with Tribeca Enterprises. The college became known as Flashpoint Chicago, a campus of Columbia College Hollywood.

Columbia College Hollywood has operating and degree-granting authority in the Chicago region from the Illinois Board of Higher Education (IBHE).

The campus closed at the end of the 2021–2022 academic year with the college's president claiming that the institution was struggling with enrollment, particularly during and immediately after the COVID-19 pandemic.

== Campus ==
The Flashpoint Chicago campus occupied the fifth and sixths floors of the historic Burnham Center building at 28 North Clark Street in the downtown Chicago Loop.

The campus was located near museums, performance venues, and a wide range of annual cultural events. The neighborhood is bordered on the north by Chicago's historic theatre district and the Chicago Riverwalk and on the east by Millennium Park and the shoreline of Lake Michigan.

Flashpoint Chicago's 52-seat screening room was a space for students in all disciplines to view professional work and showcase their own productions. The screening room was equipped with 4K projection, Blu-ray playback, 7.1 surround sound, and wireless microphone and computer connections for speakers and presenters.

In 2019, Flashpoint expanded upon existing studio space and built a full scale, three-wall set in the middle of campus. Adjoining this studio are classroom/production office spaces and a wardrobe, makeup and props room, as well as a film student meeting room. Down the hall is a second, black-box rehearsal studio. All of these resources are accessible to students right in the middle of campus.

Flashpoint Chicago also had three suites for post-production digital film editing. The private rooms were soundproof and include space for collaborators to join in the session.

The music studio at Flashpoint Chicago was a professional audio recording facility equipped with 24 channels of audio and designed to accommodate musical ensembles of different styles and sizes. It includes four live rooms all interconnected to a large control room, including a vocal booth, an array of studio microphones, speakers, a variety of instruments, including a grand piano and a drum kit.

The professional-quality equipment room was stocked with industry-standard film, video, and sound equipment, available for students to check out and use on film productions and coursework as well as independent productions. It is fully stocked with cases, accessories, and supplies.

The Foley/Automated Dialog Replacement (ADR) suite was a sound-isolated booth and control room where students learn to record, edit, and mix dialog, sound effects, and audio for their projects. The Foley/ADR suite is equipped with multiple microphones, monitors, and industry-standard computer hardware and software.

Flashpoint Chicago had four audio mini suites, which are high-tech workstations in private, sound isolated rooms suitable for editing and mixing music and sound design. Each room is equipped with software, studio monitors, and large screen video monitors for editing sound to video. Two mini suites are alongside a dedicated narration booth for voice over work.

The library and learning commons offered quiet study space and a variety of print and digital publications and other media.

== Academics ==
Columbia College Hollywood offered liberal arts degree programs focused on the art and science of communications and the diverse media of contemporary storytelling, including film, graphic design, interactive media, visual effects, digital media production, and recording arts.

Flashpoint had integrated critical studies competencies and skills into the outcomes of specialty courses. Critical Studies learning outcomes include critical thinking and problem solving, oral and written communication, global awareness and responsibility, information literacy, quantitative reasoning, and aesthetic literacy.

Columbia College Hollywood had operating and degree-granting authority in the Chicago region from the Illinois Board of Higher Education (IBHE).

=== Faculty ===
Courses at Columbia College Hollywood's Flashpoint Chicago campus were taught by professionals. The college's general education faculty members had academic backgrounds in the humanities, natural and social sciences, technology, business, and art.
