= Tony Corrente =

American football official (born 1951)

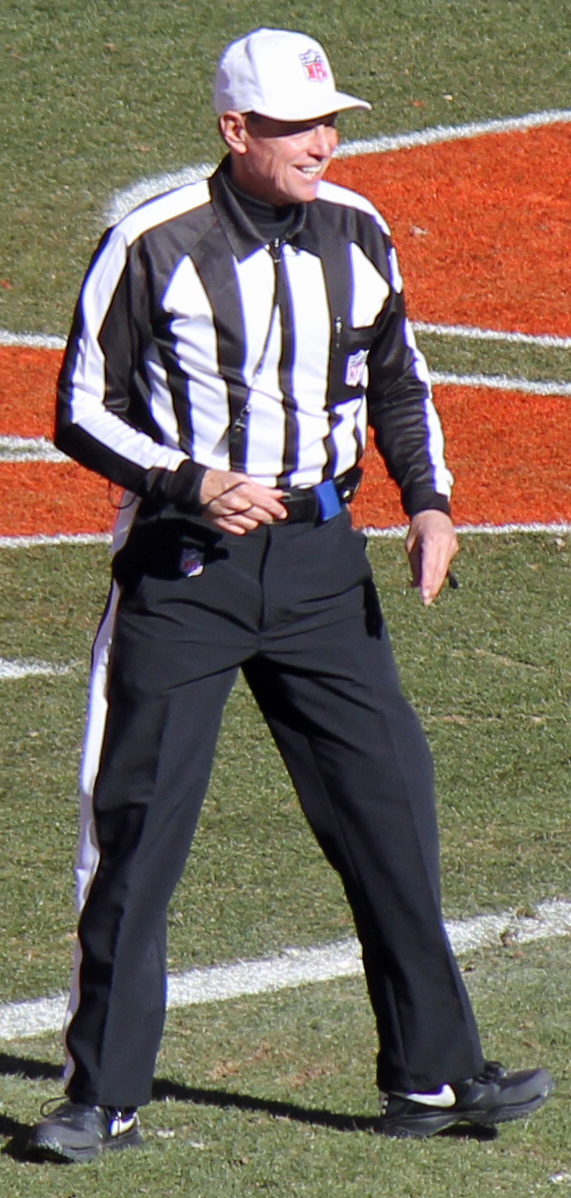
- Corrente in the 2013 NFL postseason.
- Born: November 12, 1951 (age 74); Los Angeles County, California, U.S.
- Occupations: NFL official (1995–2021); Social sciences teacher (La Mirada High School)

Anthony Joseph Corrente (born November 12, 1951) is a former American football official in the National Football League (NFL) who served for 26 years from 1995 until his retirement in 2021. He wore uniform number 99. He was the referee of Super Bowl XLI. He served as the coordinator of football officiating for the Pac-12 Conference from June 2011 until he resigned this position in October 2014.

== Personal ==
Corrente resides in La Mirada, California. He attended Cerritos College and then earned a bachelor's degree from California State University, Fullerton in 1975 and a master's in education from Azusa Pacific University in 1988. Outside of his NFL officiating duties, Tony formerly taught social sciences at both William Neff and La Mirada High Schools. He retired in 2011 and was diagnosed with cancer in 2012. As a former baseball coach, his teams won the California Interscholastic Federation Southern Section 3-A Championship in 1988 and were the runner-up for the same title in 1991.

== Officiating career ==
=== Early years and college ===
Corrente began his officiating career in 1971 working high school and junior college level games as a member of the Long Beach and San Gabriel Valley Football Officials Associations. Between 1971 and 1981, Corrente officiated three California Interscholastic Federation Southern Section Championships and seven Junior College Bowl games as both a referee and back judge.

In 1981, he was appointed to the staff of the Pacific Coast Athletic Association (later renamed Big West Conference) where he officiated the Freedom and California Bowls. His last 6 years in the Big West was as a full-time Referee. In 1991, Corrente joined the officiating staff of the Western Athletic Conference (WAC) where he officiated the Alamo, Aloha, and Rose Bowls. Corrente resigned as Commissioner of Officiating for the Pac-12 Conference October 8, 2014, citing personal and professional reasons. His resignation came on the heels of several dubious calls in marquee games by Pac-12 officials, claimed by some to adversely affect the outcome of Pac-12 standings.

=== National Football League ===
In 1995, Corrente was selected to become a member of the NFL officiating staff as a back judge (the title was changed to field judge in 1998) before being promoted to referee at the beginning of the 1998 NFL season. In his three seasons as a back judge, he worked two playoff games including the 1997 NFC Championship Game. Corrente also officiated in NFL Europe working the World Bowl in both 1995 (back judge) and 1998 (Referee). In 1998, he became a referee after Dale Hamer returned to the head linesman (now down judge) position and Gary Lane returned to the side judge position. Corrente worked the NFC Championship Game in 2000 between the Minnesota Vikings and New York Giants at Giants Stadium in East Rutherford, New Jersey, and the 2009 AFC Championship Game between the New York Jets and the Indianapolis Colts at Lucas Oil Stadium in Indianapolis. Since joining the NFL in 1995, Corrente has been involved in 13 post-season assignments including 3 AFC/NFC Championships and as the alternate Referee in Super Bowls XL and 50 and as Referee in Super Bowl XLI between the Chicago Bears and the Indianapolis Colts.

Corrente was treated for throat cancer during the 2011 NFL season. In the second half of the season opener at M&T Bank Stadium on September 11, he sustained pain in his head, back and buttocks after being knocked backwards to the turf while trying to break up a skirmish between Matt Birk and Michael Oher of the Baltimore Ravens and Ryan Mundy and LaMarr Woodley of the Pittsburgh Steelers. Based on advice from a former member of his officiating crew, Corrente took Motrin instead of Tylenol for pain relief following the match. Unaware of its antiplatelet effect, he experienced bouts of coughing up blood while continuing to use the drug for the following two weeks. After the discovery of a cancerous mass at the base of his tongue, he opted to eliminate the tumor through chemotherapy and radiation instead of having it surgically removed. The seven-week course was performed at the University of Texas MD Anderson Cancer Center. Corrente was inactive from officiating during Weeks 13 through 15. He was able to referee the New Orleans Saints' 45–28 victory over the Detroit Lions in an NFC Wild Card match at the Mercedes-Benz Superdome on January 7, 2012.

On November 4, 2012, Corrente yelled “God damn it!” (slipping past CBS censors) and other obscenities during the Miami Dolphins-Indianapolis Colts game. Kevin Harlan of CBS Sports apologized for this act. Corrente apologized afterwards; he was fined a game check by the National Football League.

Corrente was named as referee for the AFC Championship Game on January 19, 2014, in Denver between the Broncos and New England Patriots. He was the referee of the January 18, 2015, NFC championship game between the Seattle Seahawks and the Green Bay Packers. He was also the referee of the game known for the Double Doink, the NFC Wild Card game on January 6, 2019, between the Philadelphia Eagles and Chicago Bears.

In a Monday Night Football game on November 8, 2021, between the Chicago Bears and Pittsburgh Steelers, Corrente faced controversy. On a third down play with 3:40 left in the game with the Steelers leading 23–20, Bears linebacker Cassius Marsh sacked Steelers Quarterback Ben Roethlisberger which forced the Steelers to punt back to the Bears; however, Marsh was penalized for unsportsmanlike conduct which gave the Steelers an automatic first down. Replays showed Marsh stared down the Steelers bench but never said a word which caused controversy. Replays also showed Corrente hip-checking Marsh when Marsh was heading back to his bench before throwing the flag which appeared to have been done on purpose by Corrente. The Steelers would eventually score a field goal to extend their lead and the penalty cost the Bears the win as the Steelers won 29–27. After the game, Marsh said that Corrente hip checking him was "incredibly inappropriate" while Corrente said that the contact between him and Marsh had nothing to do with that.

On January 24, 2022, the NFL announced Corrente would be the official for the 2022 Pro Bowl.
