= Digital learning assets =

Digital Learning Assets (DLAs) are any form of content and/or media that have been formatted into a binary source which include the right to use it for the purpose of "facilitating learning". DLAs are most commonly found in online learning such as academic coursework and corporate training.
