= Curtis Marsh Sr. =

American football player (born 1970)

Curtis Marsh
No. 89, 17, 88
- Position: Wide receiver

Personal information
- Born: November 24, 1970 (age 55); Simi Valley, California, U.S.
- Listed height: 6 ft 2 in (1.88 m)
- Listed weight: 201 lb (91 kg)

Career information
- High school: Royal (Simi Valley)
- College: Utah
- NFL draft: 1995: 7th round, 219th overall pick

Career history
- Jacksonville Jaguars (1995–1996); Pittsburgh Steelers (1997); Cleveland Browns (1999)*; Saskatchewan Roughriders (2000−2001)
- * Offseason or practice squad member only

Awards and highlights
- CFL All-Star (2000)

Career NFL statistics
- Receptions: 9
- Receiving yards: 141
- Stats at Pro Football Reference

Career CFL statistics
- Receptions: 141
- Receiving yards: 2,165
- Receiving touchdowns: 15

Curtis Joseph Marsh Sr. (born November 24, 1970) is an American former professional football player who was a wide receiver for three seasons in the National Football League (NFL) and two seasons in the Canadian Football League (CFL). He was selected by the Jacksonville Jaguars in the seventh round of the 1995 NFL draft, and played for the team for two seasons. He played for the Pittsburgh Steelers in 1997. He played for the Saskatchewan Roughriders from 2000 to 2001, and was named a CFL All-Star following the 2000 season. He played college football for the Utah Utes. He attended Royal High School in Simi Valley, California.

Pre-draft measurables
Height	Weight	Arm length	Hand span	40-yard dash	10-yard split	20-yard split	20-yard shuttle	Vertical jump
6 ft 1 3/8 in (1.86 m)	212 lb (96 kg)	31 7/8 in (0.81 m)	10 in (0.25 m)	4.68 s	1.68 s	2.77 s	4.41 s	32.5 in (0.83 m)
All values from NFL Combine

Marsh's sons both played in the NFL. Curtis Marsh Jr. is a former cornerback, and Cassius Marsh is a former defensive end.
