= Barry Moltz =

Small business speaker

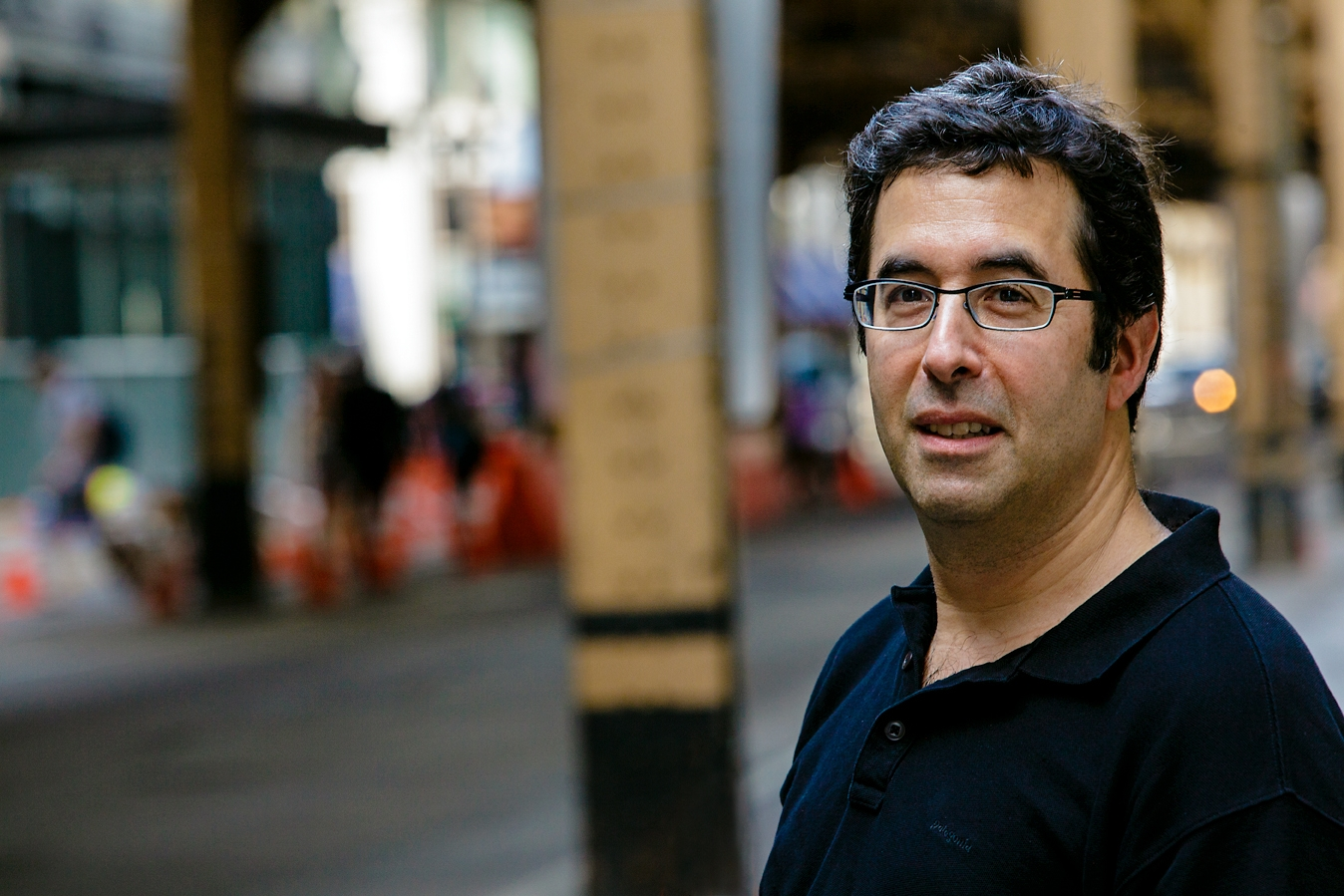
- Born: January 22, 1960 (age 66); Glen Ridge, New Jersey
- Citizenship: United States
- Education: Brandeis University (BS); Northwestern University (MBA)
- Occupation: Small business speaker
- Years active: 2001-present
- Board member of: Clearview Social
- Awards: Entrepreneurship Hall of Fame; Top 100 People of Chicago’s Hi-Tech community
- Website: barrymoltz.com

Barry Moltz is an American author and speaker in small business and entrepreneurship. He is a member of the Entrepreneurship Hall of Fame, and he taught entrepreneurship as an adjunct professor at the Illinois Institute of Technology. He has been featured on television and radio programs including CNBC’s The Big Idea with Donny Deutsch, MSNBC’s Your Business, and NPR’s The Tavis Smiley Show. He also hosts a radio show named Business Insanity Talk Radio, which is aired on AM560. He is a regular writer for the American Express OPEN Forum.

== Career ==
He started his career at IBM, where he received many awards at both the branch and regional level. He left IBM to join Whittman-Hart, where he became Director of Sales, and a Member of the Executive Committee. After leaving Whittman-Hart, Moltz co-founded three start-up companies. As of 2014, Barry serves on the Board of Clearview Social.

== Conferences ==
In November 2010, Barry was featured at the GrowSmartBiz Small Business Conference which was organized by Network Solutions, LLC and the Washington Business Journal in Washington D.C. The topic was "How Social Media Has Made Customer Service the New Marketing — Deliver or Die".

In June 2012, Barry spoke at 2012 BlogWorld, a conference dedicated to blogging and the business of blogging.

== Publications ==
The following is the list of books written by Barry Moltz.

- You Need to Be a Little Crazy: The Truth About Starting and Growing Your Own Business (2008)
- Bounce! The Path to True Business Confidence (2008)
- BAM! Delivering Customer Service in a Self Service World (2009)
- Small Town Rules: How Big Brands and Small Businesses Can Prosper in a Connected Economy (2012)
- How to Get Unstuck (2014)

== Awards ==
In 2001 and 2002, Moltz was chosen by I-Street Magazine as one of the Top 100 People of Chicago’s Hi-Tech community.

== See also ==
- Small business
- Distributism
