= Learning commons =

Type of educational facility

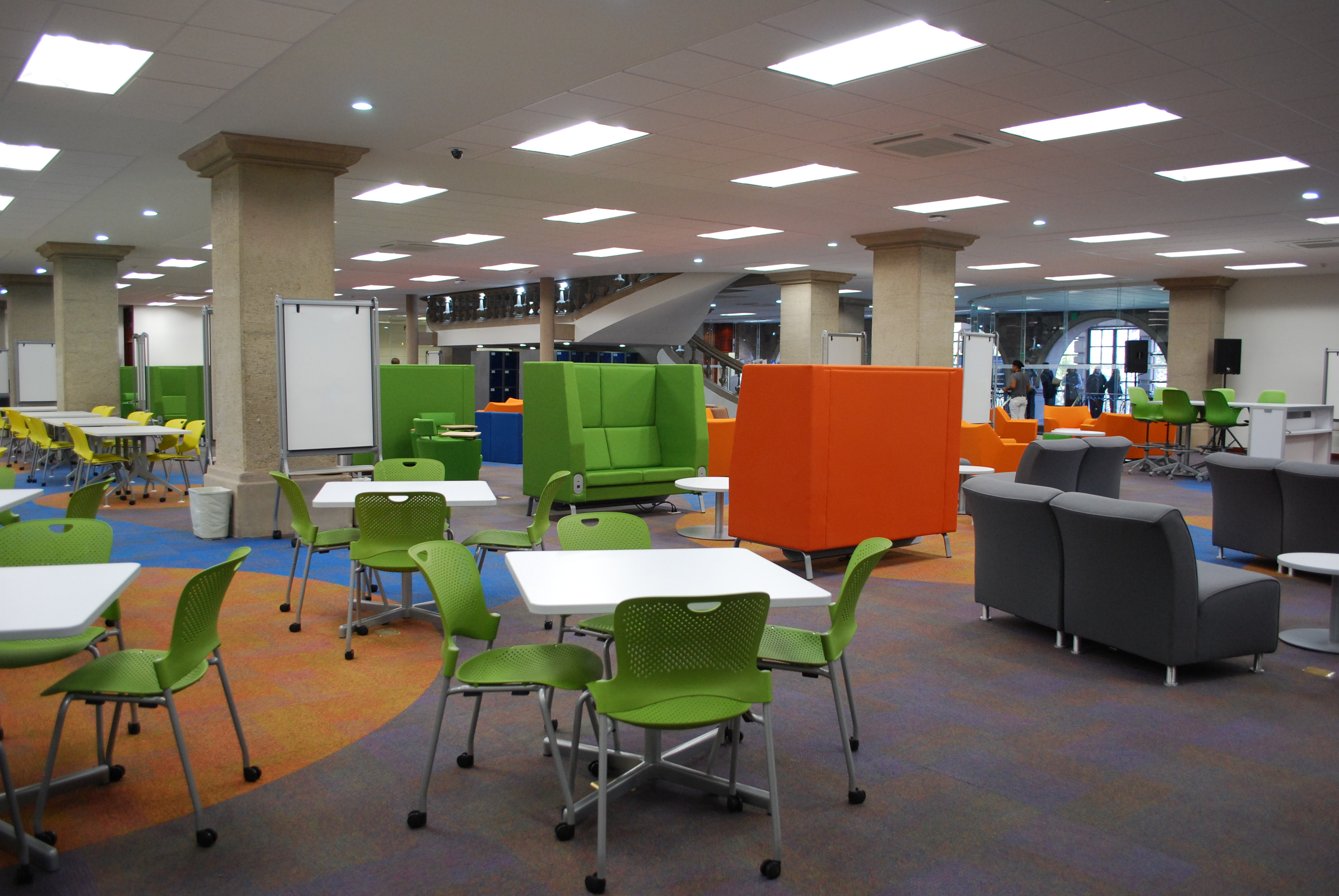
Learning commons inside the library of Tec de Monterrey, Mexico City

A learning commons (also called a scholars' commons or information commons) is a technology-rich, flexible space for collaborative study and information sharing. There is typically a stronger focus on digital technology in a learning commons than in a standard library.

Learning commons are similar to libraries and classrooms that share space for information technology, remote or online education, tutoring, collaboration, content creation, meetings, socialization, playing games, and studying. They are increasingly popular in academic and research libraries, and some public and school libraries have also now adopted the model.

Architecture, furnishings, and physical organization are particularly important to the character of a learning commons, as spaces are often designed to be rearranged by users according to their needs. Learning commons may also have tools, equipment, makerspaces, and/or publishing services available for loan or use. Along with the so-called "bookstore model," which is focused on customer service, bookless or digital libraries, the learning commons is frequently cited as a model for the "library of the future."

== History and development ==
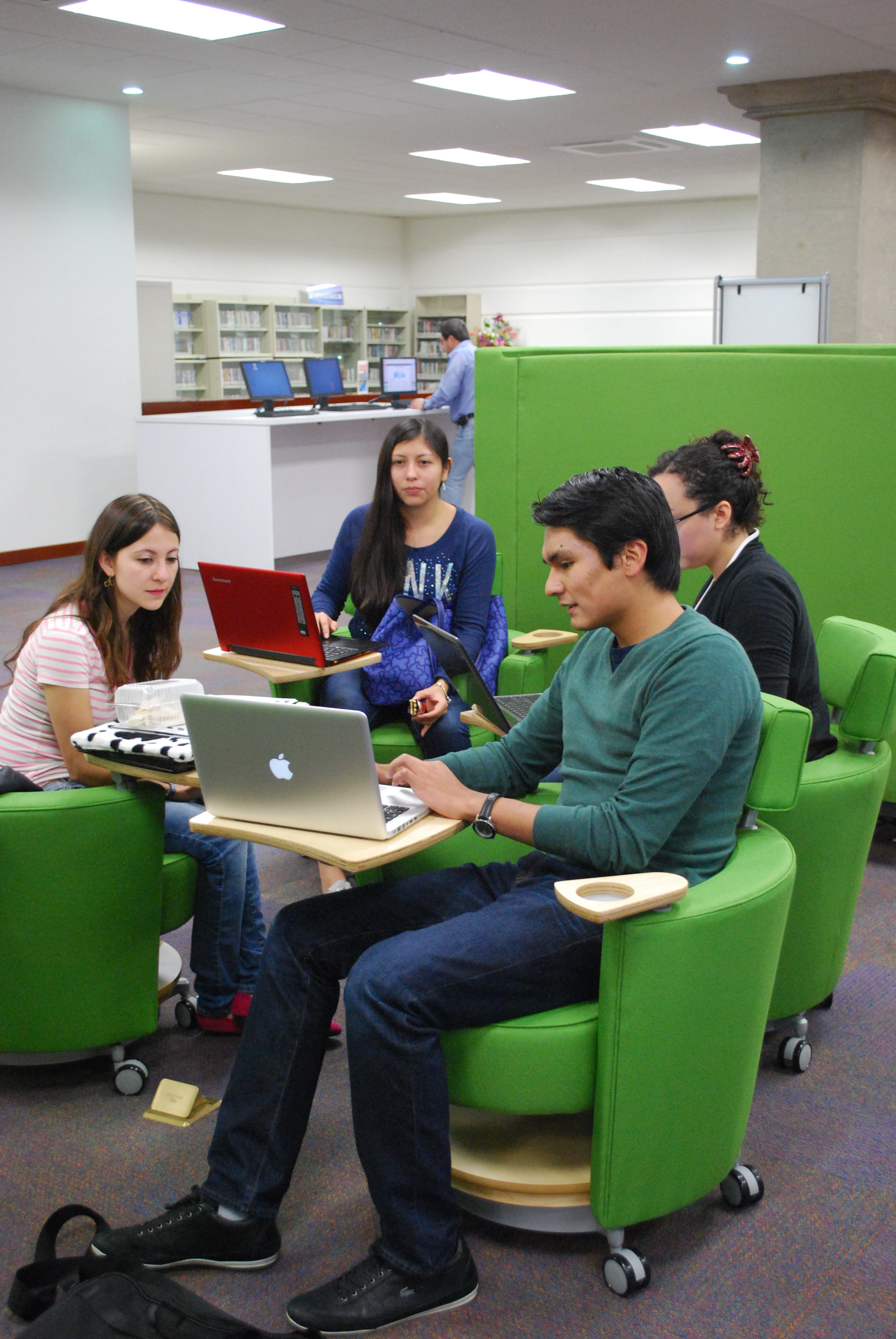
Students learning to work with Wikipedia in the learning commons of Tec de Monterrey, Mexico City

Learning commons have developed across the United States and other countries in academic libraries since the early 1990s, when they were more frequently called "information commons." Two such early examples were the Information Arcade at the University of Iowa (1992) and the Information Commons at the University of Southern California (1994).

By 1999, Donald Beagle had noted the emergence of the learning commons as "a new model for service delivery in academic libraries," and proposed that it could be characterized by offering "a continuum of service" from information retrieval to original knowledge creation. This approach, often called "one-stop shopping," could be facilitated, Beagle suggested, though application of strategic alignment, a management approach adapted from information technology (IT) enterprise planning.

Increased use of the term "learning commons" had become apparent by 2004, when the University of Southern California hosted a national conference titled "Information Commons: Learning Space Beyond the Classroom." Beagle's white paper at this conference proposed a developmental pathway "From Information Commons to Learning Commons," based on a typology of change adapted from research by the American Council on Education. This white paper defined an information commons as a library-centric "...cluster of network access points and associated IT tools situated in the context of physical, digital, human, and social resources organized in support of learning."

A learning commons, by contrast, was no longer library-centric, as "…when the resources of the information commons are organized in collaboration with learning initiatives sponsored by other academic units, or aligned with learning outcomes defined through a cooperative process." These definitions were later adopted and elaborated on by Scott Bennett, Yale University librarian emeritus. Since the late 1990s, hundreds of learning commons have developed and morphed in response to Web 2.0 technologies and the continuous evolution of functions for libraries and librarians. Web 2.0 technologies—such as blogs, social networking sites, video sharing sites, and web apps—have had a radical impact on the way information is exchanged and engaged in. A learning commons takes these technologies into consideration and then adapts to provide the best possible services to the new Web 2.0 users and students.

There are two major causes of the driving force for an institution to place various services in the library. The first is the reduction of space used to print in-house materials of little use to students and faculty compared to digital resources rapidly accessible through Internet-based services. The second is the prime location on campus that most libraries have managed to secure, as libraries often free up space through weeding out their print collections, and a synergistic service can develop in support of students with other service departments.

== Why a learning commons ==
Students appear to have natural abilities to use emerging technology. Although they easily grasp the entertainment and communication value of the devices they use, they need to be taught how these tools can be used in learning and critical thought ... and this is a task for the learning commons.

There is also growing consensus among educators that students need to learn transferable skills in order to work efficiently and successfully in their future world. To do so, students will need to become critical consumers of information, effective problem solvers, capable decision makers, and innovative communicators. They will require the skills and ability to flow with change. Most of all, they will need to understand that these transferable skills give them the capacity to make a difference in the world.

A learning commons provides boundless opportunity for growth, based on a cross-curricular perspective that recognizes literacy, numeracy, knowledge, thinking, communication, and application as foundations for learning how to learn. Both physically and virtually, the learning commons becomes the catalyst where inquiry, imagination, discovery, and creativity come alive and central to growth—personal, academic, social, and cultural.

Inquiry in particular can be promoted in a learning commons. Through the process of inquiry, individuals construct much of their understanding of the natural and human-designed worlds. Inquiry implies a "need-or-want-to-know" premise. It is not so much seeking the right answer—because often there is none—but rather seeking appropriate resolutions to questions and issues. For educators, it implies emphasis on development of inquiry skills and nurturing of inquiring attitudes or habits of mind that will enable individuals to continue the quest for knowledge throughout life.

An effective learning commons will accommodate all learners and address multiple learning styles and learning levels. Safe, inclusive, and welcoming environments throughout a school are imperative to meet the diversity of styles and abilities of individuals, teams, and groups. x

== Learning commons, student services, and the institution ==
A learning commons allows for academic libraries to provide wider-ranging, more cohesive services to students and users. Meshing numerous services maintains the classic library's traditional reference and research elements while at the same time adding exciting new services that support new technologies and service in a larger, more integrated environment. The learning commons reflects a marked shift in our conception of the library, a shift driven by evolving understanding of its role in support of student learning. The emergence of the learning commons as a central element in contemporary library design offers an opportunity to transform the library's role on campus from a provider of information to a facilitator of learning.

Often, libraries and learning commons share responsibility for delivering college-wide outcomes: developing effective research strategies, finding resource materials for a particular topic and evaluating their appropriateness, honing effective oral and written communication skills, and promoting good study and learning habits. The goal of librarians' work in a learning commons should be to encourage all students to engage in substantive ways with multiple services in the organization. Properly implemented in an academic library, this model of library service benefits all parts of the institution. Cohesiveness and purpose among the diverse elements of the library allow both the library and the school to run more smoothly and efficiently, and students' needs are met in an environment designed to provide multiple services in a single location.

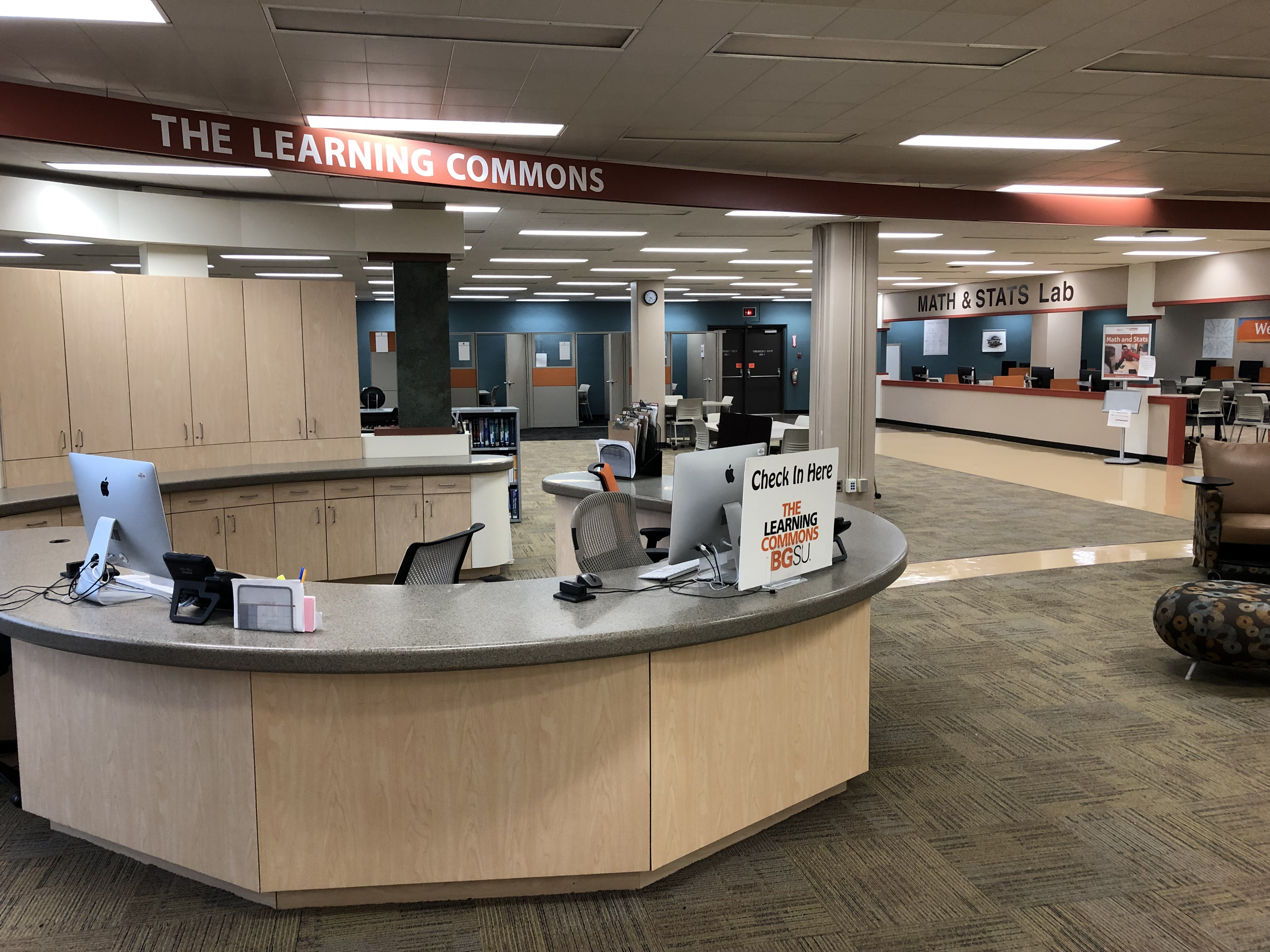
A dedicated learning commons space can enhance learning experiences

New or renovated library space is now commonly repurposed to bring students together to work, study, and socialize. Learning commons typically offer comfortable furniture for both individual and group study, modular furnishings that allow users to customize the environment to suit their needs; access to wireless networks and electrical outlets, multimedia labs and support; and often a café accompanied by relaxed food and drink restrictions. Such an environment helps promote learning commons as places to expand and integrate learners' choices to share their experiences. Virtual learning spaces increase this potential still more.

As learning commons become more widespread, it is similarly to be expected that the learning commons model itself will be enhanced. One such enha is the learning commons transformative model (LCTM), developed by Dr. Alexander Jones. The LCTM sets clear goals with specific criteria of importance to measure the correlation with teaching outcomes and use of space and technology. It includes knowledge-building; collaborative engagement; integrative learning; fostering of literacy, creativity, and expression; development of positive social maturation; and efficient use of space and enhanced teaching.

The challenge for learning commons is discovering how to reconfigure the current spaces both inside and beyond a school and its library walls to reflect this new reality. Access to the technology that makes it possible, obviously, is critical. Yet the digital divide is a very real problem in academic libraries currently and will remain so for the foreseeable future. Although this can be a problem in a highly technological library model, when learning commons work efficiently, then students' needs are provided for through library orientations, research/reference classes, technology courses, one-on-one assistance, and effective and in-library peer assistance. These services should be developed online as well as in person for maximum benefit of the students and the school.

== Importance of the role of the school library ==
The school library, a key component of a learning commons, has an integral and transformative role to play in implementing this fresh and innovative vision for education.

Where properly developed, a school's library is already the hub for networking and information access. As the learning commons concept grows, a school library's collection-based facilities will continuously change and expand, creating access-based services suited to the needs of a school community. This process will mean changes in the operations of a school's library. Resource collections will need to be reshaped even more rapidly and readily than currently to reflect their communities as well as the world at large. It is the only way for a library's access to the global, interconnected, and interactive communication networks of the future.

Every member of a school's population will ultimately participate in the creation of a learning commons, but the concept's early coordination and leadership will rest with school library expertise. In working together, teacher-librarians in partnership with others can modify the process, content, product, and environment to meet the needs of a diverse student population. The result will be empowered learners. The learning commons model creates an ideal environment for the teacher-librarian to utilize teaching methods that allow for both formal and informal learning.

Recent research on academic libraries shows that students rely heavily on quiet, structured study spaces, especially when their living environments are noisy or crowded. Studies of late-night library use at multiple universities have found that students use these spaces primarily for focused academic tasks such as studying, writing, and preparing for exams, and that access to quiet environments contributes to their productivity and academic confidence.

== Educational commons ==
Educational commons are conceptually related to learning commons but focus on the shared governance, open access, and collaborative creation of educational resources. Defined as the process of learning, transmission, and acquisition of knowledge, and methods of governing this process are collectively managed and co-constructed by the entire educational community. Whereas learning commons focus on the physical or virtual spaces where collaboration and resource-sharing occur, educational commons focus on the process and resources themselves such as textbooks, curricula, and digital learning materials, ensuring that they are freely available and co-managed by communities.

The educational commons framework builds on principles of open access and community participation, based on the work of Elinor Ostrom on commons-based resource management, in alignment with the goals of democratizing education and reducing systemic inequalities by treating knowledge as a shared public good rather than a private commodity.

The concept of educational commons complements the goals of learning commons by emphasizing the importance of collaboration in not just how resources are used but also how they are created and governed. Although both frameworks follow the principles of the commons in the educational and knowledge sector that aim for foster inclusivity, equity, and community engagement, educational commons focus more broadly on the systemic level of resource accessibility and management.

One of the key applications of educational commons is through open educational resources (OER), which are freely accessible teaching, learning, and research materials, often made available through online platforms. OER initiatives, such as those championed by UNESCO, aim to bridge the gap in educational access by removing financial and geographical barriers to learning. For example, in rural and underserved areas, OER can provide students and teachers with access to high-quality educational content without need for costly textbooks or proprietary software.

Examples of educational commons include:

- Open-access platforms like Khan Academy and OpenStax, which provide free educational materials to learners worldwide.
- Community-driven initiatives, in which local educators collaboratively develop and share curricula tailored to their region's needs.
