= 1871 (company) =

American non-profit startup incubator

- Founded: 2012; 14 years ago
- Tax ID no.: 20-8411320
- Legal status: 501(c)(3) organization
- Location: 111 N Canal St 12th Floor, Chicago, IL 60606
- Services: Business incubator services
- CEO: Elizabeth "Betsy" Ziegler
- Website: 1871.com

1871 is a nonprofit digital startup incubator in the Merchandise Mart, Chicago, Illinois. It was founded in 2012 by J. B. Pritzker and is the flagship project of The Chicagoland Entrepreneurial Center (CEC), a nonprofit organization that helps entrepreneurs build high-growth, sustainable businesses that serve as platforms for economic development and civic leadership. Led by CEO Betsy Ziegler, 1871 has become a major hub of Chicago's technology and entrepreneurial ecosystem and hosts over 400 early-stage companies as well as nationally recognized accelerators, industry-specific incubators, and tech talent schools. In 2019, UBI Global recognized 1871 as the Top Private Business Incubator in the World and Most Promising Incubator for Women Founders.

== History ==
In the early 2000s, some of the major players in Chicago's economy were the Chicagoland Entrepreneurial Center, the Chicago Innovation Awards, Chicago Ideas Week and TechNexus. Due to emerging competition in the space, in 2012 TechNexus decided to shift its target market audience to more well-developed and established companies, including the Illinois Technology Association, Emerge, and 200 more. This allowed 1871 to open in Chicago's ecosystem to help foster new enterprises and support corporations already based in Chicago. In 2020, 1871 acquired the Illinois Technology Association. In 2016, Harvard Business School published a case study on the emergence of Chicago's ecosystem.

== Community ==
1871 offers work space to over 200 companies. Its partnerships and sponsorships with UPS, Google For Entrepreneurs, and Chase expose the people working there to the greater tech space. 1871 offers free work space to students from Trinity Christian College, DePaul University, University of Illinois, Illinois Institute of Technology or DeVry University, University of Chicago, Northwestern, and Loyola. It also hosts networking events and workshops.

Since 1871 was created, a number of innovation spaces specializing in specific sectors have been established, including the Connectory (an 1871 partner specializing in IoT), Matter (healthcare), and Relish Works (food service).

== Funding controversy ==
As a nonprofit incubator, 1871 takes money from the state to bring in capital for tech startups. Critics, including Novel Coworking CEO Bill Bennet, believe "we shouldn't use the state money that way". "It doesn't make sense to me why we should use taxpayer funds to subsidize one place", Bennet said. One of the main arguments against the funding is that there are other non-state-funded avenues for startups to find affordable working spaces, like WeWork. Former 1871 CEO Howard A. Tullman argued that the space provides resources other co-working spaces cannot, such as mentoring, workshops, and events for the entrepreneurial community.

The tax statements of 1871's parent company, Chicagoland Entrepreneurial Center (CEC), are public. The Chicago Tribune estimates that 27% of 1871's 2013-14 earnings were reported on its tax statement as "salaries, compensation and benefits".

== Expansion ==
In April 2016, 1871 officially opened its 3.0 expansion, which enlarged the space by 41,000 square feet. This expansion created more classrooms and office spaces for some of its largest companies, such as Impact Engine, Accenture, and Options Away. The expansion was funded entirely by 1871 and the Chicago Entrepreneurial Center, with no government grants. The estimated daily encounters at 1871 grew from 1,000 people to 2,000 with the expansion. As of 2016, over 500 companies work out of 1871.

== Further reading and viewing ==
This is 1871 by Chicago poet Nate Marshall, created for the facility's grand opening, February 29, 2012.
