= Curtis Marsh Jr. =

American football player (born 1988)

Curtis Marsh
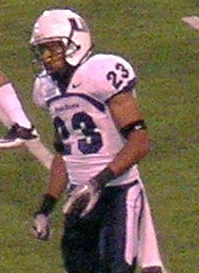
- Marsh with the Utah State Aggies in 2010

No. 31, 22
- Position: Cornerback

Personal information
- Born: March 1, 1988 (age 38); West Hills, California, U.S.
- Listed height: 6 ft 1 in (1.85 m)
- Listed weight: 197 lb (89 kg)

Career information
- High school: Royal (Simi Valley, California)
- College: Utah State
- NFL draft: 2011: 3rd round, 90th overall pick

Career history
- Philadelphia Eagles (2011–2012); Cincinnati Bengals (2013); Philadelphia Eagles (2013); Denver Broncos (2015)

Awards and highlights
- Second-team All-WAC (2010)

Career NFL statistics
- Total tackles: 14
- Pass deflections: 2
- Stats at Pro Football Reference

Curtis Joseph Marsh Jr. (born March 1, 1988) is an American former professional football player who was a cornerback in the National Football League (NFL). He was selected by the Philadelphia Eagles in the third round of the 2011 NFL draft. Marsh was released by the Eagles at the end of the 2013 preseason and signed by the Cincinnati Bengals. He played college football for the Utah State Aggies.

Marsh's father, Curtis, played wide receiver in the NFL for three seasons.

== Early life ==
Born in West Hills, California, and raised by his mother, Trayci Gibson with his sister M'haganee Kahlil Gibson. Marsh graduated from Royal High School in Simi Valley, California in 2006. Marsh received a football scholarship to the Naval Academy Preparatory School after graduating from high school. Marsh left the school after three months and received a scholarship offer from Utah State University.

== College career ==
With the Utah State Aggies, Marsh began his career as a running back and became a cornerback starting in junior year. Marsh rushed 82 times for 302 yards as a freshman in 2007 in 10 games (3 starts) and 42 times for 185 as a sophomore in 12 games (3 starts) in 2008. In each season, Marsh scored two touchdowns. As a cornerback in 2009, Marsh made 32 tackles (23 solo, 9 assisted), deflected five passes, and intercepted one pass. In the November 14, 2009 game against San Jose State, Marsh blocked a punt. As a senior in 2010, Marsh made 45 tackles (37 solo, 8 assisted) and 2 interceptions.

Marsh received second-team All-Western Athletic Conference honors after his senior season. Marsh graduated from Utah State in 2011 with a degree in business and economics.

== Professional career ==
Pre-draft measurables
Height	Weight	Arm length	Hand span	Wingspan	40-yard dash	10-yard split	20-yard split	20-yard shuttle	Three-cone drill	Vertical jump	Broad jump	Bench press
6 ft 0 1/2 in (1.84 m)	197 lb (89 kg)	32 in (0.81 m)	9 in (0.23 m)	6 ft 3 3/8 in (1.91 m)	4.51 s	1.60 s	2.64 s	4.07 s	6.87 s	37.5 in (0.95 m)	10 ft 3 in (3.12 m)	12 reps
All values from NFL Combine

=== Philadelphia Eagles (first stint) ===
Marsh was selected by the Philadelphia Eagles in the third round with the 90th overall pick of the 2011 NFL draft. He played all four preseason games and made his regular season debut on Week 11 of 2011 (November 20), a 17-10 win over the New York Giants. In seven games in 2011, Marsh made 2 tackles and one defended pass.

=== Cincinnati Bengals ===
Marsh signed with the Cincinnati Bengals on September 18, 2013. He was released by the Bengals on October 1, 2013.

=== Philadelphia Eagles (second stint) ===
Marsh was signed by the Philadelphia Eagles on November 5, 2013. He was released by the Eagles on August 30, 2014.

=== Denver Broncos ===
Marsh signed with the Denver Broncos on December 30, 2014.

Marsh was waived on September 15, 2015 to make room for T. J. Ward who was suspended for the first game of the season.
